= Battle of San Pietro =

1734 battle of the War of the Polish Succession

Coordinates: 44°48′N 10°18′E

- Part of the War of the Polish Succession
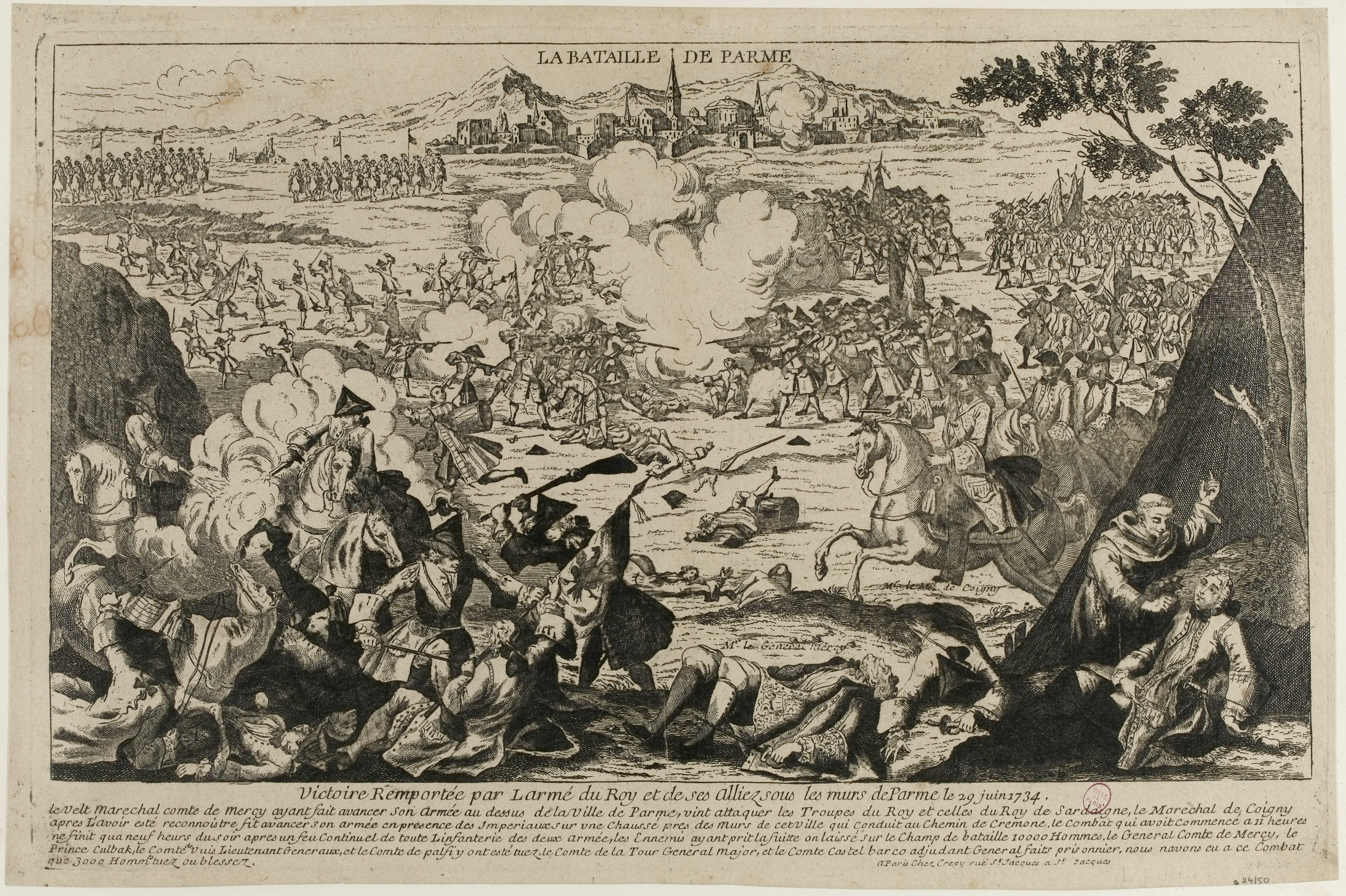
- Battle of Parma (engraving, c. 1735)
Date	29 June 1734
Location	Crocetta, near Parma, then in the Duchy of Parma, present-day Italy
Result	Franco-Sardinian victory

Belligerents
France; Sardinia	(Habsburg monarchy) Habsburg Austria

Commanders and leaders
(Kingdom of Sardinia) Charles Emmanuel III of Savoy (Kingdom of France) François de Coigny (Kingdom of France) Duc de Broglie	(Habsburg monarchy) Florimund Mercy † (Habsburg monarchy) Louis of Württemberg

Strength
60,000 men	50,000 men

Casualties and losses
4,400 killed and wounded	6,200 killed and wounded

The Battle of San Pietro (29 June 1734), also known as the Battle of Crocetta or the Battle of Parma, saw a Franco-Sardinian army commanded by François de Franquetot de Coigny defeat a Habsburg Austrian army led by Count Claude Florimond de Mercy. During this battle of War of the Polish Succession, Coigny's Allied army was made up of soldiers from the French Royal Army and the Kingdom of Sardinia.

In late 1733, the Allied armies under Marshal of France Claude Louis Hector de Villars, 1st Duke of Villars and King Charles Emmanuel III of Savoy quickly overran the Duchy of Milan, expelling its outnumbered Austrian defenders. Reinforcements arrived and allowed the Austrians to retain the important fortress of Mantua. Frustrated by poor cooperation between the French and their Sardinian and Spanish allies, the Villars left the army but died on the way back to France. For the 1734 campaign, the Austrian government appointed the one-eyed Mercy, who was in poor health, to lead its army in Italy. When Mercy lost the sight in his good eye, Prince Louis of Württemberg (Note: Frederick Louis of Württemberg-Winnental is referred to as Louis while Henry Frederick of Württemberg-Winnental is referred to as Frederick. Louis was Frederick's younger brother (Sutton, p. 228).) assumed command of the Austrian army. prince Louis led the army across to the south bank of the Po River and pressed the Allies back to Parma.

At this time, Charles Emmanuel left the Allied army when his queen fell dangerously ill, leaving Coigny in temporary command. On 26 June, Mercy suddenly reappeared with his vision restored and retook command. He demanded an immediate attack on the north side of Parma, but Louis persuaded him to attack on the south side. When the Austrians encountered Allied forces on 29 June, Mercy insisted that they were facing token opposition. Ignoring the objections of Louis, Mercy led an immediate attack and was killed. The Austrians mounted four major assaults in the area between the village of La Crocetta and the city of Parma but failed to overcome the Allied defenses. Both sides suffered significant casualties in the battle, which lasted for most of the day. The badly shaken Allies decided to retreat, but they were able to claim victory when they found the Austrians had already withdrawn during the night.

== Background ==
Following the death in February 1733 of King Augustus II of Poland, European powers exerted diplomatic and military influence in the selection of his successor. Stanisław Leszczyński was Poland's king from 1705 to 1709 when he was deposed. Stanisław's daughter Marie Leszczyńska married French King Louis XV, making him Louis' father-in-law. France connived to place Stanisław on the throne. This would make Poland a French ally and create a northern threat to Habsburg Austria, France's traditional enemy. On 12 September 1733, Stanisław was elected by the Polish nobility.

Charles Emmanuel III

In July 1733, the Russian Empire sent an army led by Peter Lacy into Poland; it arrived near Warsaw on 5 October. After Russian persuasion and threats, the Polish nobles acclaimed Frederick August, Elector of Saxony as King Augustus III. Stanisław traveled to Gdańsk (Danzig), arriving there on 10 October. Lacy's army forced its way into Warsaw though it was not until 16 January 1734 that the Russian army occupied Toruń (Thorn). The Russians only reached the outskirts of Gdańsk in February. The Siege of Danzig finally ended on 30 June 1734 when it surrendered to the Russian army, though Stanisław escaped via the Kingdom of Prussia.

The French government looked for ways to strike at Habsburg Austria, which was ruled by Charles VI, Holy Roman Emperor. France chose not to attack the Austrian Netherlands because it would make enemies of the Kingdom of Great Britain and Dutch Republic. Only a few imperial fortresses such as Philippsburg and Kehl could be attacked along the Rhine River. France avoided a major invasion of Germany, fearing it might drive the German principalities into the arms of Austria. However, Austrian possessions in Italy were vulnerable, so France worked to build an alliance with the Kingdom of Sardinia. In an Italian campaign, France would have Spain as its ally, since Spain coveted Habsburg territories in Italy. On 27 August 1733, France signed the Treaty of Turin with King Charles Emmanuel III of Sardinia.

== Operations ==
=== Franco-Sardinian initiative ===
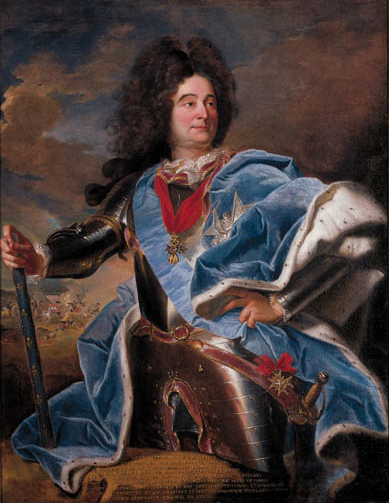
Claude de Villars

The Austrian government was caught off balance, only learning of the Franco-Sardinian alliance on 8 October 1733. The Austrians had field armies totaling 45,000 soldiers. Garrisons included 18,000 in northern Italy, 21,000 in southern Italy, 20,000 in the Austrian Netherlands, 9,000 in forward bases, 30,000 in Hungary, and 7,000 in Habsburg hereditary lands. North of the Alps, the French occupied the Duchy of Lorraine on 13 October 1733. The main French army under Marshal James FitzJames, 1st Duke of Berwick concluded the brief Siege of Kehl on 31 October 1733 when its garrison evacuated the fortress with the honours of war.

The French assembled an army in the province of Dauphiné that numbered 30,000 infantry and 8,000 cavalry. On 12 October 1733, the French army began crossing the Alps and rendezvoused with the Sardinian army near Vigevano on 29 October. Field Marshal Wirich Philipp von Daun and General der Kavallerie Prince Frederick of Württemberg-Winnental were in command of the 21,000 Austrian defenders of northern Italy, though only 13,340 were fit enough to take the field. The Austrians evacuated Pavia in such haste that 30 cannons were left behind. To the amazement of observers, the Austrians abandoned the Duchy of Milan except for Novara, Tortona, Pizzighettone, and Milan's citadel. Marshal Claude Louis Hector de Villars, 1st Duke of Villars arrived in Turin on 7 November, replacing Lieutenant General (LG) Claude François Bidal d'Asfeld as the French commander. Daun was so distressed at the impending debacle that he went to Vienna to explain himself in late October, leaving Prince Frederick in command.

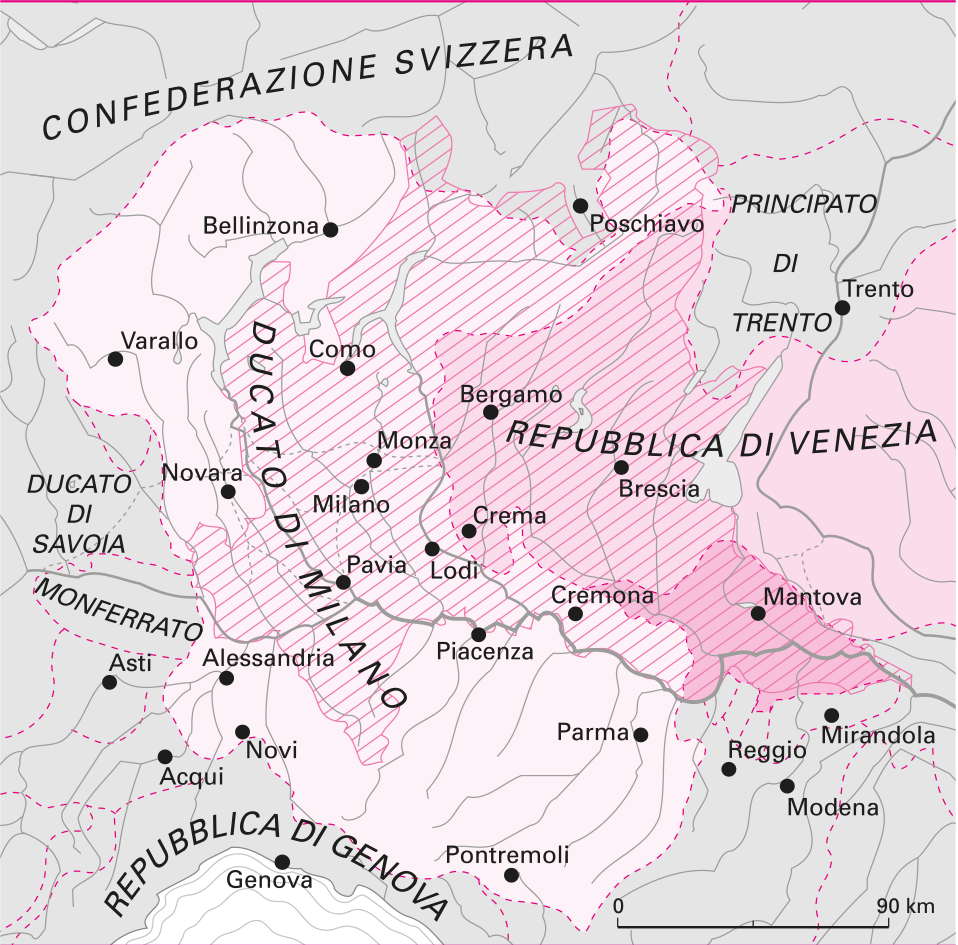
Map shows the locations of Milan (Milano), Pavia, Novara, Mantua (Mantova), and Parma. Tortona is east of Alessandria and Pizzighettone is southeast of Lodi.

On 11 November 1733, Villars arrived at the Allied army's camp as it prepared for the Siege of Pizzighettone. The Allied army counted 26,000 soldiers and 58 guns while the Austrian defenders numbered 3,700 men with 45 guns and 3 mortars. The siege continued from 13 November to 9 December when the place surrendered. The garrison was allowed to march to Mantua. The Milan citadel was besieged by 17,000 Allies from 11–29 December before the 1,700-man garrison capitulated. Novara's 1,300 defenders surrendered to 13,000 Allies on 7 January 1734 and Tortona's 1,400-man garrison surrendered to 12,000 Allies on 5 February. The Austrian garrisons were allowed free passage to Mantua as part of the surrender terms.

Villars hoped to employ a 26,000-man Spanish army under José Carrillo de Albornoz, 1st Duke of Montemar that began arriving in northern Italy. To Villars' frustration, after the new year, Montemar received orders to march to conquer Naples, leaving the south bank of the Po River unprotected. Montemar's campaign would result in the Bourbon conquest of the Two Sicilies. After the Allies captured all the Austrian fortresses in Lombardy, the next logical objective was Mantua. Its capture would prevent the Austrians from reinforcing their army in Italy. However, Charles Emmanuel was satisfied with the seizure of the Duchy of Milan and unwilling to make any moves that would jeopardize his position. The Sardinian king feared that moving Allied troops to the south bank of the Po would allow the Austrians to gain ground on the north bank. An unusually heavy snow in late February halted Allied operations. Despite the Sardinian king's opposition, Villars was able to transfer 10,000 Allies under LG François de Franquetot de Coigny to the south bank of the Po to replace the missing Spaniards.

=== Austrian offensive ===
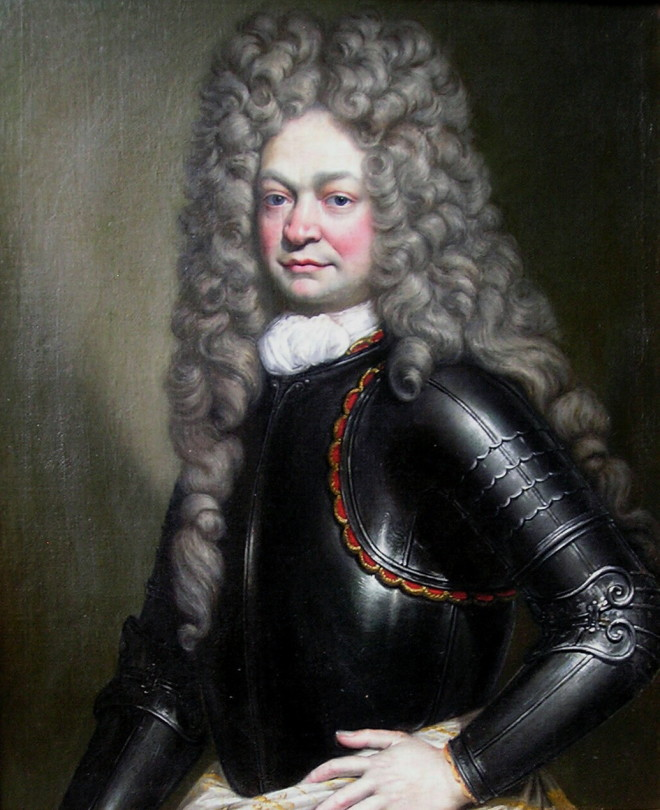
Claude de Mercy

In February 1734, the new Habsburg commander Field Marshal Count Claude Florimond de Mercy arrived in Italy with 12,000 reinforcements to add to the 20,000 Austrians concentrated at Mantua. Mercy served in the army for 52 years and was extremely brave, but blind in one eye and near-sighted in the other. In March, Allies under François-Marie, 1st duc de Broglie occupied Guastalla and Mirandola on the south bank of the Po. During this time, the Austrians received more reinforcements. Also in March, Mercy lost the vision in his good eye, possibly from an epileptic seizure. This event placed Mercy's second-in-command Feldzeugmeister Prince Louis of Württemberg-Winnental, brother of Prince Frederick, in temporary control of the Austrian army. Prince Louis came under pressure from the emperor and Field Marshal Prince Eugene of Savoy, president of the Hofkriegsrat (Imperial War Council), to launch an offensive. The strengthening of Austrian forces continued so that by 19 April, Villars estimated that he was facing 55,000 enemies.

On 2 May 1734, Austrian forces crossed to the south bank of the Po near San Benedetto Po. This action compelled Coigny and eight battalions to withdraw to Guastalla. Villars countered this move by a probe across the Oglio River on the north bank of the Po, but this force bumped into an Austrian brigade and retreated. By 9 May, Coigny retreated to a position with his right flank at Parma and his left flank on the Po. Clearly, the Austrians exploited the fact that the Allied army was divided with forces on the north and south banks of the Po. On 26 May, the ailing Villars was allowed to leave the army, but he never made it home. He died at Turin on 17 June 1734.

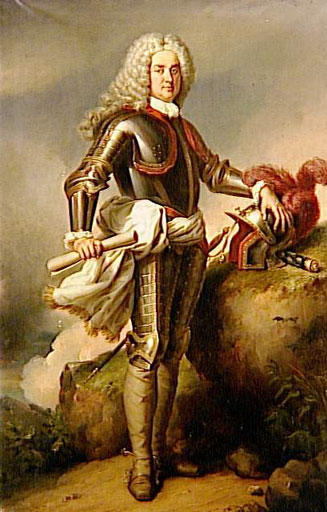
François de Coigny

In May 1734, after suffering a major attack that made him blind and unable to speak, Mercy left the army for the thermal baths at Abano Terme. However, he was not formally replaced in command. When Mercy tried to direct the army from Abano, the emperor ordered him to stop until he recovered. Field Marshal Dominik von Königsegg-Rothenfels was appointed to command the army but was unable to immediately take charge. On 17 May, Prince Louis led the Austrian army forward from San Benedetto along the south bank of the Po. By 26 May, the Austrians were across the Enza River at Sorbolo and nearing Parma. On 1 June, the Austrian advance prompted the French Secretary of State for War, Nicolas Prosper Bauyn d'Angervilliers to scold Coigny and LG François-Marie, 1st duc de Broglie for retreating. The next day, Coigny reported that he finally convinced Charles Emmanuel to shift the main Allied army to the south bank of the Po.

On 3 June 1734, Coigny led combined Franco-Sardinian forces across to the south bank of the Po. The following day, the Allies engaged the Austrians in a minor conflict. In the Battle of Colorno, the Allies led by LG Jean-Baptiste François des Marets, marquis de Maillebois sustained 700 casualties while the Austrians under Prince Louis lost 550 men. (Note: Sutton stated that the Colorno fighting occurred on 4 June (Sutton, p. 166) while Bodart asserted that it occurred on 5 June (Bodart, p. 180).) Coigny believed the Austrians were about to withdraw, but he found that his enemies were holding their positions. On 5 June, Coigny received letters from Louis XV and d'Angervilliers urging him to attack the Austrians and push them back to the area of Mantua. However, Charles Emmanuel refused to initiate a battle.

== Battle ==
=== Maneuvers ===
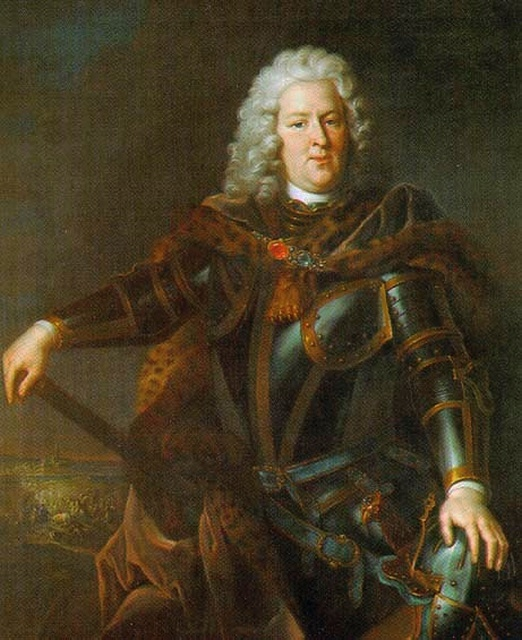
Louis of Württemberg

On 15 June, Charles Emmanuel placed the bulk of the Franco-Sardinian army in camp at Sanguigna near Colorno. Two Sardinian battalions guarded the Po bridges at Sacca and three battalions occupied Viadana on the north bank of the Po. One French and one Sardinian brigade held the ground between Colorno and the Po while the garrison of Parma was reinforced. On 17 June, the King of Sardinia shifted the Allied army southward toward Parma. He placed the army's left flank at Sant'Andrea, the right flank at Baganzola, and the headquarters at Cervera. Baganzola was only 6 km (3.7 mi) north of Parma. Charles Emmanuel feared that a major battle that might result in the loss of the Duchy of Milan. According to Bodart, the Franco-Sardinian army numbered 40,000 infantry and 13,000 cavalry. By 24 June, Charles Emmanuel left the army and was Turin because his wife Polyxena of Hesse-Rotenburg was seriously ill. During the king's absence, Coigny exercised supreme command of the Franco-Sardinian army.

Prince Louis assigned 16 battalions and 500 cavalry to defend Mantua in case the Allies suddenly attacked along the north bank of the Po. The border of the County of Tyrol was held by 3 battalions while other soldiers garrisoned Mirandola. Raimund Gerba claimed that the Austrians only had 28,000 men while Bodart credited the Austrian army with 28,000 infantry and 9,000 cavalry. John L. Sutton did not give army strengths but stated that the Austrian army was outnumbered because it left troops behind to guard places as it advanced. On 20 June, Prince Louis sent out a foraging expedition near Parma consisting of 3 cavalry regiments and 8 battalions from the Diesbach brigade. The Austrian right flank was posted at San Prospero, the left flank at Marore, and the heavy artillery at the Castle of Montechiarugolo.

On 25 June, Mercy suddenly arrived at camp with his vision restored and he resumed command. He ordered a night march and dawn assault on the Allied position for the next day. Prince Louis insisted on a reconnaissance which revealed that an attack on the north side of Parma would probably be defeated but that an attack on the south side was more favorable. On the evening of 27 June, the Austrian army received its orders to march with Mercy leading the vanguard and Prince Louis the rearguard. On the night of 28–29 June, the Austrian army camped at Antognano on the Baganza River, which was nearly dry. In a midnight council of war, the Allied generals decided to fight, and orders were issued to march at 4:00 am. The Allied infantry marched south along the west bank of the Parma River while Coigny, Broglie, and the cavalry column followed a road farther west.

=== Action ===
Marshal Coigny determined to make a stand at Parma, and on 28 June established a strong position outside the city walls. Anchoring his left flank to the city's defenses, he placed the right at the village of Crocetta, where it was further protected by swampy areas of the Taro River. The road between Crocetta and Parma ran on a causeway, and Coigny had deep trenches dug on either side of the road.

Marshal Mercy crossed the Taro canal at the head of his army and at about 10 am fired on the French advance posts, who withdrew. On reaching Crocetta, Mercy ordered Frederick, who had command of the Austrian left, to attack without delay. The Prince objected that he first had to cross more troops over the river and align them. Then Mercy said "Je vous laisse faire et je ferai la chose à ma mode (Do what you want, I will do it my way)" and led the right into battle. His troops began advancing, filling in the trenches with fascines amid a withering bombardment by the allies. The first wave was repulsed, but Mercy persisted in the attack, ordering fresh regiments into the assault. They continued to work filling the trenches, using the piled bodies of their comrades in the effort. They were about to take the first French line when Mercy was struck and killed by a musket ball, creating confusion and disorder within the lines.

Frederick then arrived to take command and restore order. The Austrians gained control of the causeway and began filling the trench on the other side, this time using the accumulated bodies of their enemies. Frederick had two horses shot out under him, and eventually withdrew from the battle with a minor wound. However, the Austrians persisted in the attack, driving the French to the walls of Parma amid continued heavy fighting. There the French made a desperate stand, and successfully stopped the Austrian advance. The Austrians then withdrew to the south after the onset of darkness.

== Aftermath ==
The Austrians lost 6,172 killed and wounded, including Marshal Mercy and 6 generals. There were also a great many deserters. The French lost 4,000 killed and wounded and the Sardinians 400. While the allies held the battlefield, it was not considered a great victory due to the heavy casualties.

Frederick found refuge in the Montechiarugolo castle, where he wrote a report of the battle to the emperor, blaming the failure on Mercy's recklessness. The Austrians eventually retreated to the Secchia River, where they were joined in July by reinforcements and a new leader, Field Marshal Königsegg. There was little significant conflict as the two armies faced each other across the Secchia until September, when Königsegg began a series of moves that culminated in the Austrian defeat at Guastalla, again with heavy casualties, on September 19, after which the Austrians retreated to the Oglio River, a position they maintained for the rest of the year.

The battle was witnessed by the population of Parma and in particular by Venetian playwright Carlo Goldoni, who happened to be in the city.

== Notes ==
Footnotes

Citations
