= Battle of Guastalla =

1734 battle as part of the War of the Polish Succession

Coordinates: 44°55′0″N 10°40′0″E

- Part of the War of the Polish Succession
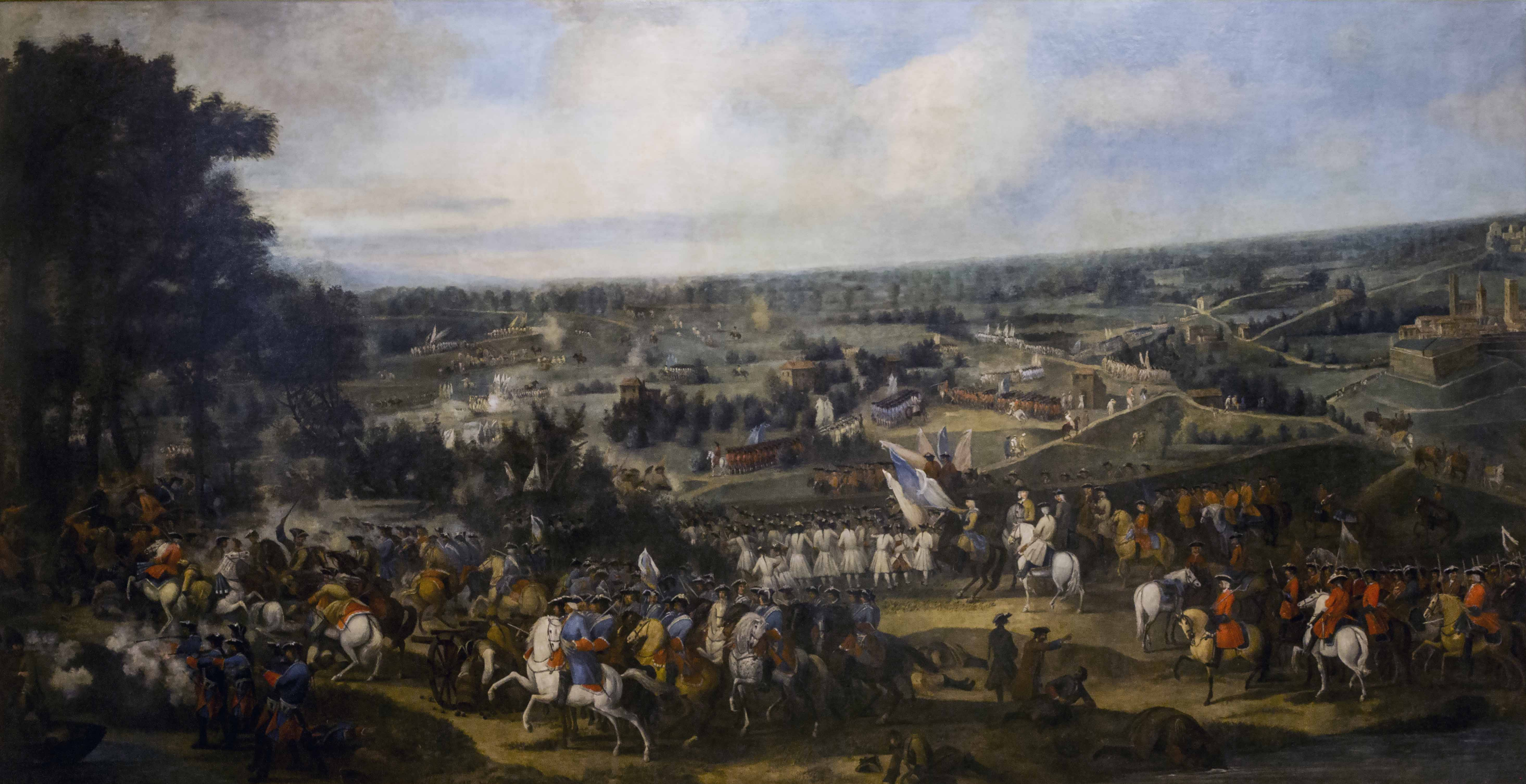
- The battle of Guastalla by Jan Peeter Verdussen
Date	19 September 1734
Location	Guastalla, County of Guastalla (present-day Emilia-Romagna, Italy)
Result	Franco-Sardinian victory

Belligerents
Sardinia; France	Habsburg monarchy

Commanders and leaders
(Kingdom of Sardinia) Charles Emmanuel III (Kingdom of France) Duc de Broglie (Kingdom of France) François de Coigny	Dominik von Königsegg; Frederick of Württemberg-Winnental †

Strength
40,000	27,000

Casualties and losses
6,000–6,148; 1,403–1,500 killed; 3,445–4,400 wounded; 100–1,300 missing	5,947–6,000; 1,589–1,600 killed; 4,164–4,200 wounded; 194–200 captured; 5 guns, 7 standards

The Battle of Guastalla or Battle of Luzzara (19 September 1734) saw an Allied army commanded by King Charles Emmanuel III of Sardinia repulse an attack by a Habsburg Austrian army led by Dominik von Königsegg-Rothenfels. In this battle of War of the Polish Succession, Charles Emmanuel's Allied army was composed of troops from the French Royal Army and soldiers from the Kingdom of Sardinia.

In late 1733, the Allied armies under Marshal of France Claude Louis Hector de Villars, 1st Duke of Villars rapidly overran the Duchy of Milan, driving out the outnumbered Austrian forces. By early 1734, the Austrians were reinforced and held onto the key fortress of Mantua. Frustrated by a lack of cooperation between his French army and the Allied armies of Sardinia and Spain, the elderly Villars quit the campaign but died on the way back to France. In June 1734, the Austrian army tried to regain the initiative but was beaten at the Battle of San Pietro and its commander was killed.

On 15 September 1734, Königsegg surprised the Allied army at Quistello and forced it to retreat to Guastalla. Believing he was only facing a rearguard, Königsegg attacked on 19 September but soon found himself engaged with the main Allied army. Perceiving that the Austrians were only attacking his left wing, Charles Emmanuel began shifting troops from his right wing to support his threatened left. Königsegg broke off the action after committing all his reserves while failing to dislodge the Allied army. Both sides suffered serious losses in the encounter. Though victorious, the Allies were unable to drive the Austrians from Mantua.

== Background ==
=== Strategy ===
The death of King Augustus II of Poland on 1 February 1733 was the spark that ignited the War of the Polish Succession. A Diet of Election was convened in August 1733 in which the nobles and gentry of the Kingdom of Poland were to select their new monarch. The Kingdom of France desired Stanisław Leszczyński to be elected because he was the father-in-law to King Louis XV. This choice was bitterly opposed by the Russian Empire and Habsburg Austria. Stanisław was an ex-king of Poland who had been deposed many years earlier by the Russians. Europe had been mostly peaceful since the Peace of Utrecht in 1715. That came to an end when Stanisław revealed himself at Warsaw on 10 September 1733.

France wished to hurt her traditional enemy, Austria, which was ruled by Charles VI, Holy Roman Emperor. To fulfill this purpose, it would benefit France to have Austria's neighbor Poland as an ally. France also wanted to oppose Austria in Germany and in Italy. France could not attack the Austrian Netherlands because that would bring the Kingdom of Great Britain and the Dutch Republic into the war against it. In Germany, France could operate against the imperial fortresses of Kehl, Breisach, and Philippsburg, while trying not to provoke the various states of the Holy Roman Empire into open opposition.

In order to inflict the most harm on Austria, France needed to invade Italy and attack the Austrian possessions, the Duchy of Milan, the Kingdom of Naples, and the Kingdom of Sicily. France needed to ally itself with the Kingdom of Sardinia before it could secure access to Italy. This was accomplished when the Treaty of Turin was signed on 27 September 1733, promising Sardinia the Duchy of Milan and giving King Charles Emmanuel III command over the combined Franco-Sardinian armies. Spain was eager to ally itself with France because it wanted to acquire the southern Italian kingdoms of Naples and Sicily.

=== Operations ===
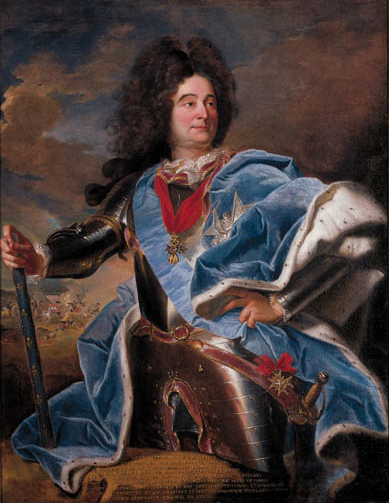
Claude de Villars

On 12 September 1733 at Wola near Warsaw, Stanisław Leszczyński was elected king by acclamation by a large crowd of Polish nobles. A Russian army led by General Peter Lacy had already invaded Poland and reached Praga on the east bank of the Vistula River on 5 October. Another election was held "under the auspices" of the Russian army and Frederick August, Elector of Saxony was declared King Augustus III. By 2 October, Stanisław left Warsaw and arrived in Gdańsk (Danzig). Lacy's army seized Warsaw on 10 October, but it did not begin the Siege of Danzig until February 1734.

A French army under Marshal James FitzJames, 1st Duke of Berwick began crossing the Rhine River on the night of 12–13 October 1733. The French successfully concluded the Siege of Kehl on 31 October. The French army of Italy began crossing the Alps on 12 October and joined the Sardinian army at Vigevano on 29 October. There were only 18,000 Austrians in Italy, mostly in garrisons. The badly outnumbered Austrians abandoned Pavia and Lombardy, leaving behind only a few garrisons. Marshal Claude Louis Hector de Villars, 1st Duke of Villars joined the French army as its commander on 11 November during the Siege of Pizzighettone. After being besieged by 26,000 Franco-Sardinians, Pizzighettone surrendered on 9 December. The 3,700-man Austrian garrison was allowed to go free but its 45 cannons and 3 mortars were captured.

Charles Emmanuel III

The Milan citadel capitulated to Lieutenant General (LG) Claude François Bidal d'Asfeld on 29 December. Novara surrendered to LG François de Franquetot de Coigny on 7 January 1734 and Tortona capitulated to LG Jean-Baptiste François des Marets, marquis de Maillebois on 5 February. In all three cases, the surrendered Austrian garrisons were allowed free passage to Mantua. However, 475 of the 1,389-man Milan garrison deserted on the march to Mantua. Overtaken by events, the Austrian commander, Field Marshal Wirich Philipp von Daun left the army in October to plead his case in Vienna. His exit left his second-in-command General der Kavallerie Prince Henry Frederick of Württemberg-Winnental as temporary leader of the army. Emperor Charles VI and Prince Eugene of Savoy rushed reinforcements to Italy and appointed a new army commander, Field Marshal Count Claude Florimond de Mercy. Unfortunately, the 68-year-old Mercy was blind in one eye and stricken with gout.

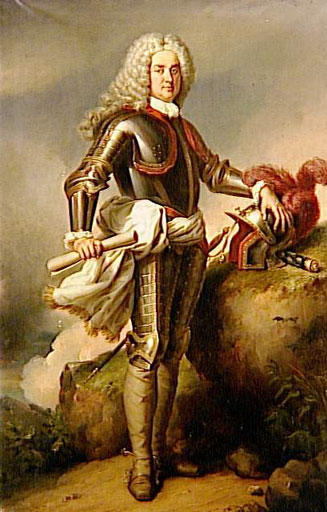
Duke of Coigny

Before help arrived, Villars might have captured weakly-held Mantua, the last Austrian fortress in Italy. However, King Charles Emmanuel was satisfied with his occupation of the Duchy of Milan and showed little interest in ejecting the Austrians from Mantua. Villars hoped that a newly arrived Spanish army under José Carrillo de Albornoz, 1st Duke of Montemar might help defeat the Austrians. To Villars' frustration, Montemar's army marched away in February to conquer Naples and Sicily. In February, after crossing the Brenner Pass, Mercy arrived in Mantua with 12,000 reinforcements. On 2 May, Mercy's Austrian army gained a foothold on the south bank of the Po River near San Benedetto Po and forced Coigny's troops to retreat to Guastalla. On 26 May 1734, the ailing Villars was allowed to leave the army. He was disgusted with the lack of cooperation from his Spanish and Sardinian allies. Villars never made it home, dying in Turin on 17 June.

Mercy suffered repeated attacks which took away the sight in his good eye, leaving his second-in-command Feldzeugmeister Frederick Louis of Württemberg-Winnental (Note: Frederick Louis of Württemberg-Winnental was the younger brother of Henry Frederick, mentioned earlier (Sutton, p. 228). Both brothers died in 1734 (Schmidt-Brentano, p. 113).) in command of the Austrian army. Württemberg-Winnental was urged to act aggressively by both Charles VI and Prince Eugene. On 17 May 1734, the Austrian army advanced west from San Benedetto on the south bank of the Po. The incapacitated Mercy tried to interfere with Württemberg-Winnental's control of the army until the emperor ordered him to stop. With the Austrians threatening to take Parma, Coigny finally convinced Charles Emmanuel to bring his Sardinian army to the south bank of the Po. The Battle of Colorno was an indecisive clash on 4 June. As the Austrian army prepared to attack Parma, a recovered Mercy suddenly appeared and assumed command. On 29 June, Mercy recklessly ordered an attack, was killed, and his army was defeated in the Battle of San Pietro.

== Quistello ==
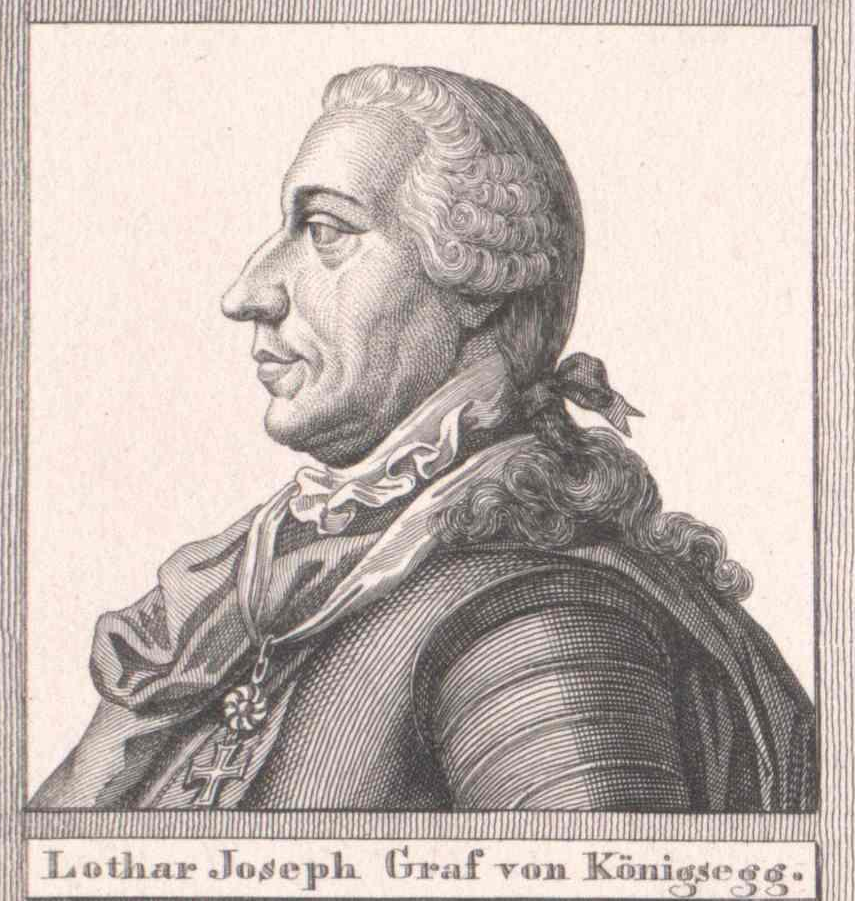
Graf von Königsegg

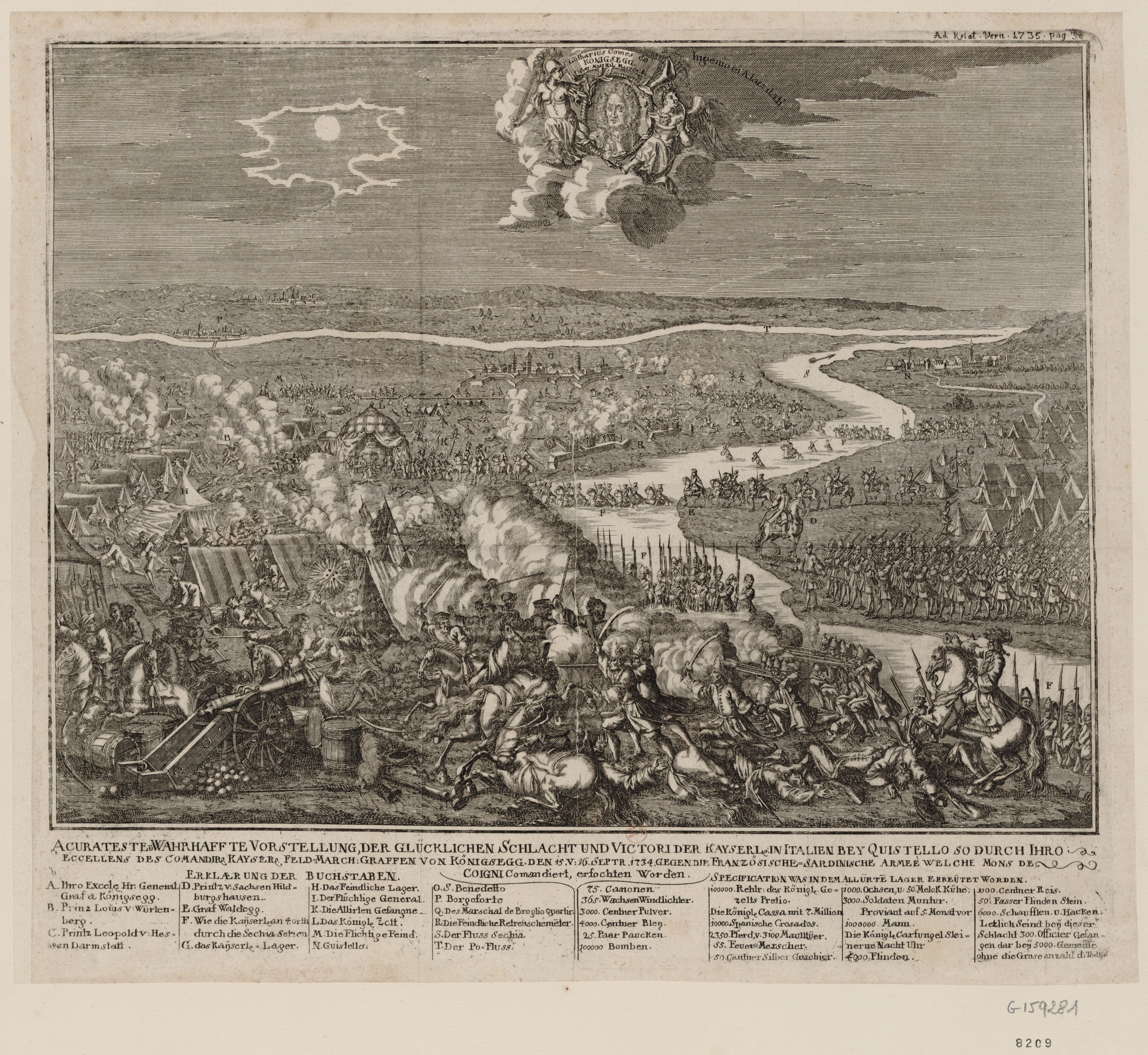
Battle of Quistello print shows Austrians crossing a river to surprise Allied soldiers.

After being defeated at San Pietro, the Austrians retreated behind the Secchia River which flows into the Po from the south. The Austrians left a 1,200-man garrison at Guastalla, but since the soldiers were badly equipped, the Allies soon compelled the garrison to surrender. Coigny's French troops followed as far as the Secchia where they paused on 13 July to let their field ovens catch up. During the advance, the French captured the city of Modena, an Austrian ally. Charles Emmanuel, who missed the Battle of San Pietro, returned to the army and authorized the pursuit. However, he declared the Austrian position on the Secchia impregnable and refused to allow an assault. The French wanted to besiege Mirandola, but the King of Sardinia refused to cooperate, even after being urged to do so by King Louis XV. Field Marshal Dominik von Königsegg-Rothenfels, who replaced Mercy, arrived to take command of the Austrian army on 11 July.

Königsegg was urged by Eugene and the emperor to attack, but he waited until he received reinforcements and money to pay for supplies. Meanwhile, the Austrians conducted probes to find weak points in the French defenses. The French planned to hold the Secchia for the winter with 37 battalions and 42 squadrons, but Charles Emmanuel desired to keep his Sardinian troops on the north bank of the Po. Königsegg launched the Raid on Quistello at dawn on 15 September and achieved complete surprise. The Austrians penetrated a gap in the French lines between the Picardy and Dauphin brigades. Austrian hussars crossed the Secchia, each carrying an infantryman on his horse. Marshal François Marie de Broglie, 1st Duke of Broglie, commanding the Advance Guard, escaped to Coigny's headquarters in his nightshirt after his own headquarters was overrun by grenadiers.

Coigny feared that his forces would be cut off from Guastalla, so he ordered a retreat. The Austrians then attacked San Benedetto where the Sardinian troops were located. Charles Emmanuel barely escaped capture, but two of his Sardinian regiments were forced to surrender. The Austrian captured many cannons, at least 1,200 wagons, baggage, and tents. According to Gaston Bodart, Königsegg carried out the attack with 15,000 infantry and 5,000 cavalry, and sustained a loss of 800 killed and wounded, plus 100 captured. The Allies had 30,000 infantry and 10,000 cavalry, and suffered losses of 1,100 killed and wounded, plus 6,000 captured. John L. Sutton quoted a letter in which Königsegg claimed to have captured 4,000 Allies. William Coxe stated that only 2,000 Allies were captured. Many Austrian soldiers turned aside to plunder the Allied camp, preventing Königsegg from fully exploiting his victory. Even so, the Allies were compelled to retreat to Guastalla.

== Battle ==
=== Deployment ===
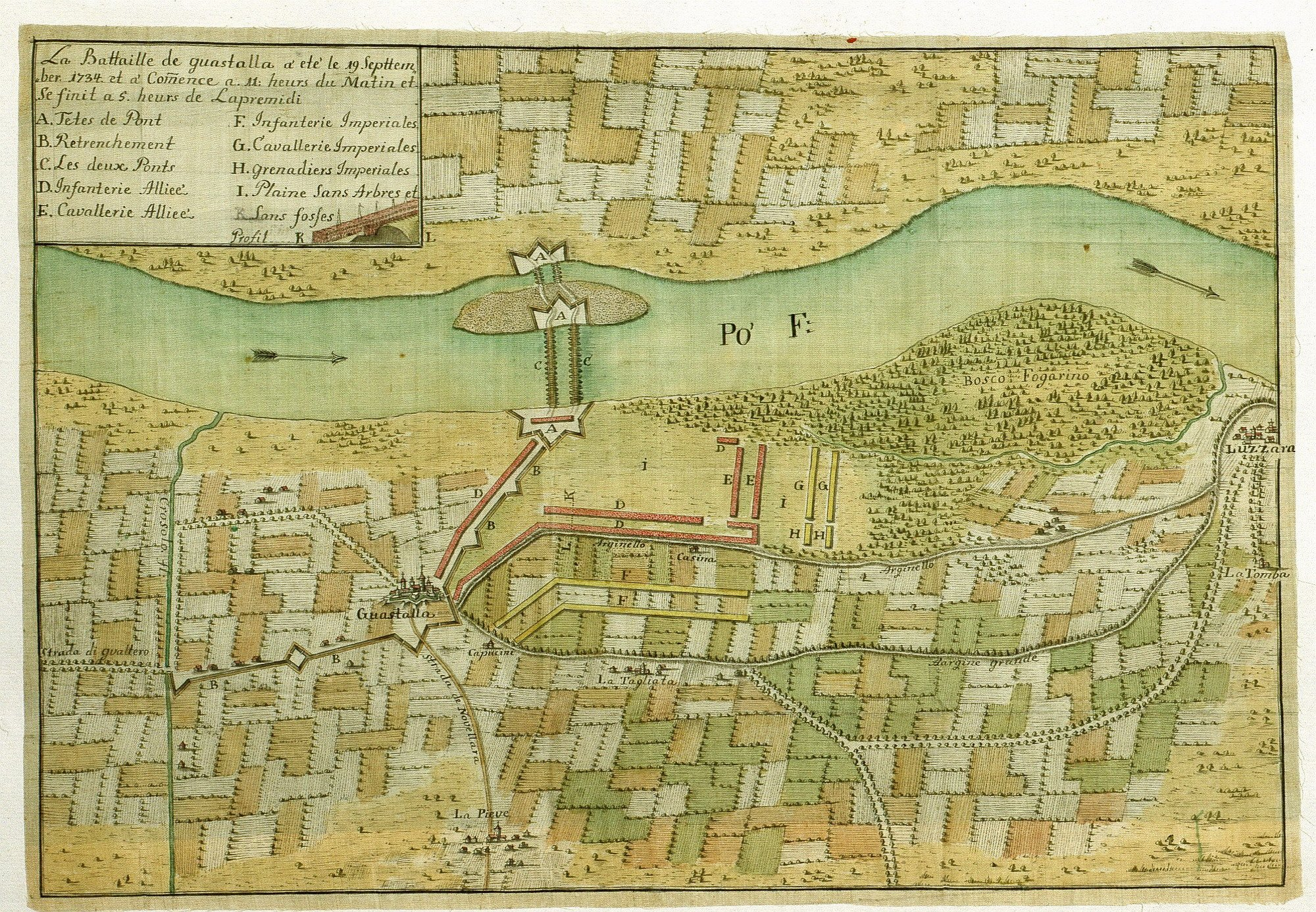
Contemporary map shows the Battle of Guastalla. The Arginello and Argine Grande are both simplified as nearly straight lines. North is toward the upper right corner.

Two embankments carrying roads ran between Luzzara and Guastalla. The embankment closer to the Po was called the Arginello, while the embankment farther from the Po was called the Argine Grande. Immediately north of the Arginello was a meadow with a few copses of trees where cavalry could be maneuvered. Between the meadow and the Po was a woodland. Between the Arginello and the Argine Grande there were smaller embankments and there were vineyards in the area. Along the Argine Grande was the village of Tagliata, a few farmsteads, and a Capuchin Monastery. The Allies' pontoon bridge across the Po was protected by a fortified bridgehead that was connected to Guastalla by a line of fortifications which included a redoubt.

Bodart credited the Allies with 35,000 infantry in 55 battalions and 5,000 cavalry in 46 squadrons, for a total of 40,000 soldiers. The Austrian army had 20,000 infantry in 38 battalions and 7,000 cavalry in more than 60 squadrons, for a total of 27,000 troops. Coigny commanded the Allied right wing while Broglie led the left wing. King Charles Emmanuel was in overall command of the Allied army and personally directed the center.

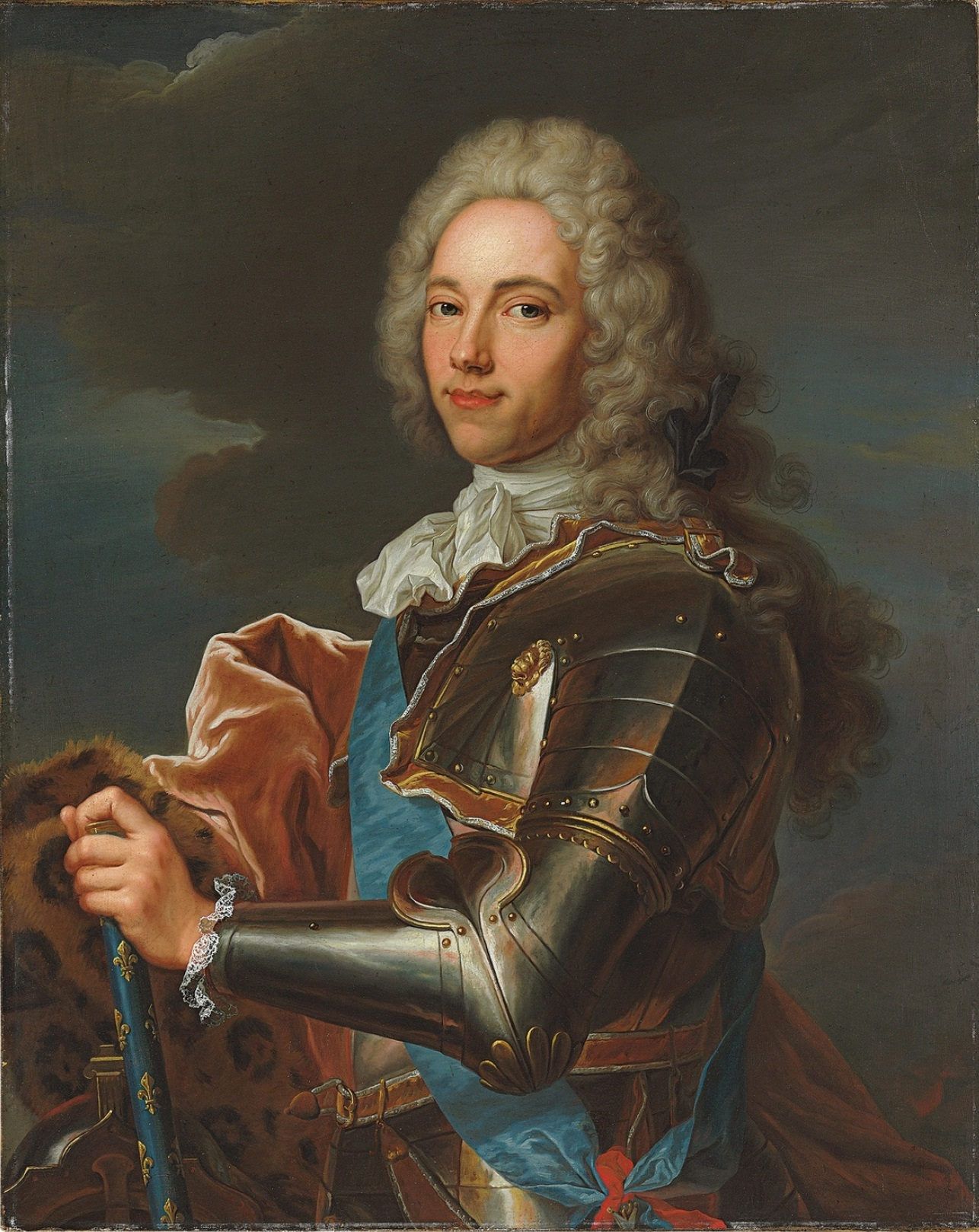
Duke of Broglie

The Allied line formed an arc from the meadow on the left to the village of Pieve (south of Guastalla) on the right. In the meadow stood the Allied left-wing cavalry. In the first line were the Piedmont and Du Roi Dragoons and the La Reine brigade, with the Toulouse and Orléans cavalry brigades in the second and third lines. Between the Arginello and Argine Grande were the Sardinian Guard and Savoia infantry brigades with grenadier companies holding farmsteads in front of the main defenses. On their left flank at the Capuchin Monastery were the Auvergne, Du Roi, and Dauphin infantry brigades in the first line and the Anjou, Maine, and Souvré infantry brigades in the second line. The Picardy and Champagne infantry brigades held Pieve on the far right. Three dragoon regiments patrolled beyond Pieve as far as the Crostolo stream on the extreme right flank. The Carabinier and Cuirassier cavalry brigades were deployed between Guastalla and Pieve, behind the infantry.

Guarding the bridgehead fortifications were two French and two Sardinian battalions. Nine more Allied battalions lined the fortifications connecting the bridgehead and Guastalla. Six cannons guarded Guastalla, a battery of ten guns covered the Argine Grande, and five cannons were placed near Pieve. Other artillery pieces were held in reserve. On the morning of 19 September, Charles Emmanuel sent two French dragoon regiments and the Sardinian Genova Dragoons and a wagon train across the bridge to the north bank. He was worried that the Austrians might operate on the north bank of the Po.

=== Action – morning ===
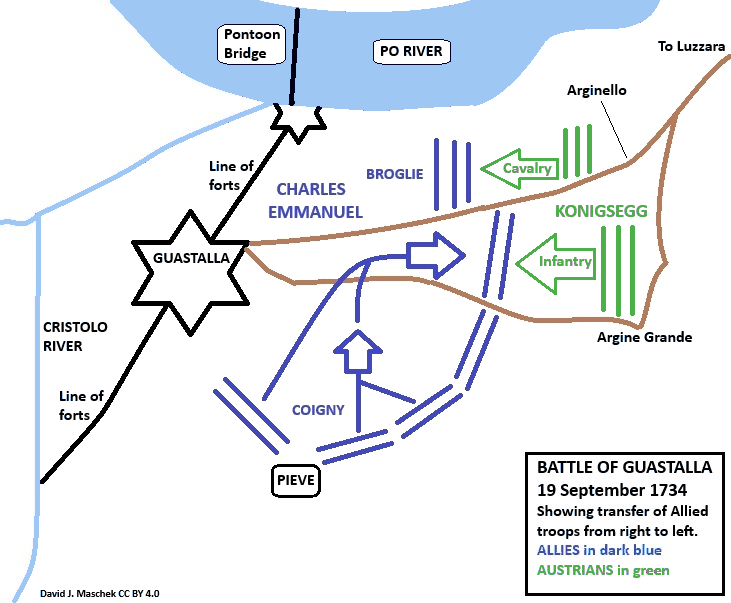
Battle of Guastalla map shows the Austrian attack on the Allied left and the Allied shift of troops from right to left.

Königsegg received a report from observers in the Luzzara church tower that dragoons and a wagon train were crossing to the north bank of the Po. There were also unfounded rumors that half of the Allied army was on the north bank. On the evening of 18 September, Königsegg determined to attack, hoping to catch the Allies at a disadvantage, but he did not share this decision with his subordinates. Patrols reported clashing with Allied forces and that only 2,000 cavalry were in the meadow. The Austrian army set out on the morning of 19 September led by a vanguard of 25 grenadier companies. The main infantry column, personally led by Königsegg, followed the vanguard. The cavalry column marched on the left of the infantry, led by Frederick of Württemberg-Winnental, Königsegg's second-in-command. At 9:00 am, the grenadiers came in sight of the Allied line when the main infantry column was one hour behind them.

Königsegg ordered a regiment of hussars forward to scout the Allied position. Feldmarschall-Leutnant (FML) Franz von Czungenberg (Note: The full names of Czungenberg (p. 23), Valparaiso (p. 104), and Colmenaro (p. 21) can be found in the Schmidt-Brentano 2006 source.) reported inaccurately that only 5,000 Allied infantry and some artillery remained and they would probably soon cross to the north bank. At 10:00 am, Königsegg sent forward 12 grenadier companies supported by five guns to clear the area between the Arginello and Argine Grande. At the same time, Czungenberg was sent into the meadow to the north of the Arginello with his cavalry. The elite companies of three Austrian cavalry regiments encountered the Allied horse in the meadow and were driven back. At 11:00 am, the Veterani and Palffy Cuirassiers advanced into the meadow in a second attack but were struck in the flank by the Du Roi Regiment and routed. Meanwhile, the attack of the grenadiers began to stall.

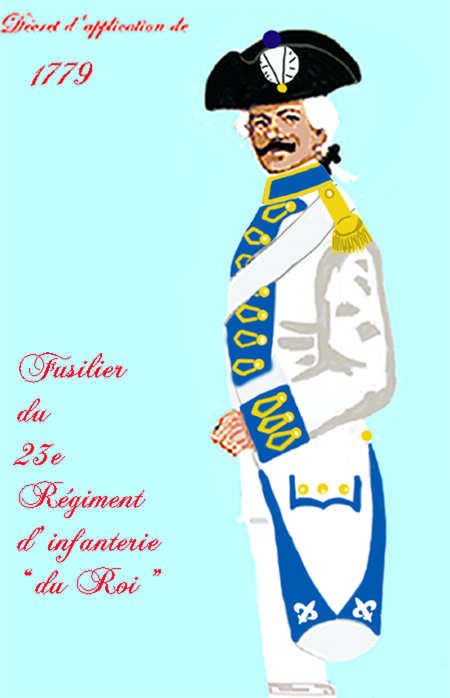
French Du Roi Infantry

Around 11:00 am, Königsegg reinforced the grenadiers with 7 battalions of infantry while feeding his cavalry into the meadow until 56 squadrons were located there. The Württemberg Dragoons charged into the battle to be met by a volley of carbine fire from the Piedmont Dragoons and a countercharge. After a melee, the Württemberg Dragoons were forced to retreat. The Austrian infantry was stopped by intense musket and cannon fire and its commander FML Bartolomé Valparaiso was mortally wounded. Königsegg sent forward 17 grenadier companies under FML Prince Joseph of Saxe-Hildburghausen. The grenadiers captured the Servites farmstead near the Arginello, but were unable to seize the Riva and Torre farmsteads near the Argine Grande. Seven infantry battalions, 29 grenadier companies, and 29 cannons were crammed into the area between the two embankments, but they were unable to advance farther. Some of the Austrian grenadiers were so demoralized that they withdrew and refused to return to the battle.

Around noon, Königsegg committed 13 infantry battalions to the action, of which a portion advanced along the Arginello. Charles Emmanuel saw that the Austrians were only assaulting his left wing and responded by transferring brigades from his right wing to his left. The Souvré brigade was the first unit to begin moving to reinforce the Allied left wing. The King of Sardinia also deployed 10 cannons in the meadow among the Allied cavalry. This move was designed to counter the effective fire from the Austrian artillery. In spite of Königsegg pushing more of his troops into the struggle, the Allies continued to repulse Austrian attacks. Nevertheless, the Allied left wing was hard-pressed, so Charles Emmanuel transferred the Picardy brigade from the far right wing to the left. The Picardy was soon followed by the transfer of the Auvergne, Du Roi, and Anjou brigades. Marshal Coigny personally accompanied the three brigades to the left wing where they formed the second line.

=== Action – afternoon ===
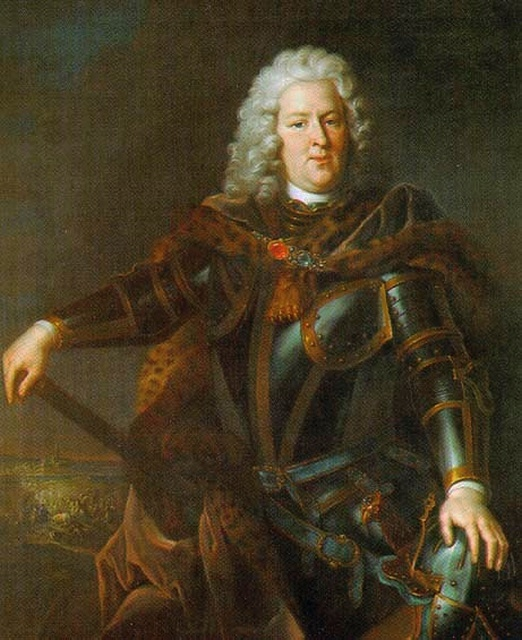
Duke of Württemberg-Winnental was killed.

Part of the Max Starhemberg Infantry Regiment peppered the Allied cavalry with musket fire from the woods, but they were countered when Allied infantry reinforcements arrived in the area. The Austrian generals tried to drive off the Allied cavalry in the meadow but were unable to take advantage of Austrian superior numbers because of the meadow's confined space. Czungenberg was wounded and around 1:00 pm Frederick of Württemberg-Winnental was killed while trying to rally the cavalry. The loss of so many senior officers caused the Austrian cavalry charges to become less effective. Some Austrian grenadiers were landed from boats on the Po and began to harass the Allied cavalry from the woods. Charles Emmanuel ordered the dragoons from the extreme right flank to move to the left, dismount, and drive off the Austrian grenadiers. The King of Sardinia also directed the Carabinier cavalry brigade to move from reserve to the meadow in order to assist the Allied horsemen.

As the Austrian infantry continued to hammer at the Allied defenses between the Arginello and the Argine Grande, Charles Emmanuel ordered the Champagne, Dauphin, and Maine brigades to move from the right wing to the left. The only remaining unit covering the former right wing was the Cuirassier cavalry brigade. At 2:00 pm, Königsegg ordered FML Wilhelm Reinhard von Neipperg and Generalfeldwachtmeister Franz Ludwig de Colmenaro to attack with the final infantry reserve of 7 battalions. The brunt of Neipperg's assault along the Argine Grande fell upon the Sardinian Guard, but it was repulsed when Maillebois brought the Maine brigade up in support. The King of Sardinia personally rallied the Guard as well as the Orléans and Toulouse cavalry brigades. Colmenaro led his troops along the Arginello against the Souvré, De Roi, and Anjou brigades. When the Champagne and Dauphin brigades arrived, the Austrian attack was defeated and Colmenaro was killed. As the Austrians fell back, soldiers from the French Picardy brigade shouted, "Rendez-vous nos havre-sacs" (Give us our haversacks), because they lost their equipment at Quistello.

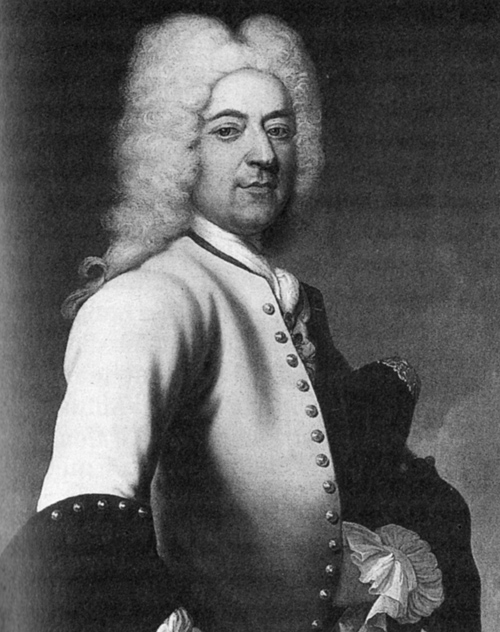
Wilhelm von Neipperg

The battle became a stalemate because too many Austrian officers were casualties. At 4:00 pm, Königsegg conceded defeat and issued orders to withdraw. At this late hour, an incident occurred that might have changed the course of the battle if the Austrians had not used up all their reserves. Two cavalry squadrons had been held back to support the Austrian infantry. These horsemen tried to rejoin their regiment which was in the meadow. As they rode along the Arginello, the two squadrons encountered the Du Roi and Souvré infantry brigades by surprise and threw them into disorder. Crossing the Arginello, the Austrian horsemen turned toward Guastalla where they rode into more Allied infantry. Convinced that their own cavalry had been driven from the meadow, the Allied soldiers panicked and took to their heels. Charles Emmanuel managed to rally them and bring them back into line only with great difficulty. The Austrian horsemen finally realized their error and galloped back the way they had come, though 80 of them became casualties.

Neipperg commanded the rearguard in the retreat to Luzzara, cleverly using the terrain to his advantage. He was well supported by the Austrian cavalry which confronted Coigny's troops when they followed too closely. Two French artillery batteries bombarded the Austrians during the pursuit. During the battle, the well-handled French artillery several times changed positions in order to enfilade Austrian assaults. The French benefited from the Vallière system, a major reform of their artillery in 1732.

== Aftermath ==
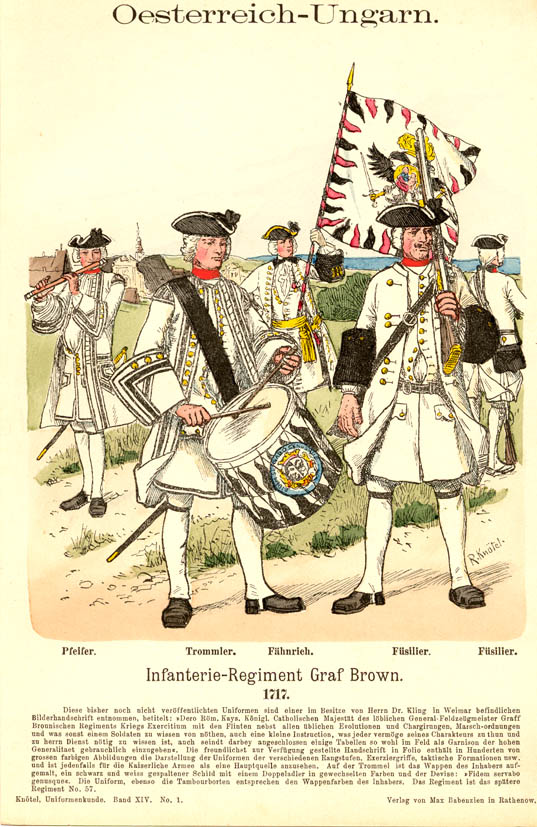
Austrian infantry 1717

While the Allies held the field of battle, both sides suffered significant casualties. Bodart asserted that the Austrians lost 1,600 killed and 4,200 wounded, plus 200 men, 5 cannons, and 7 standards captured. Austrian general officers Württemberg-Winnental, Valparaiso, and Colmenaro were killed and five others wounded. The Allies lost 1,500 killed, 4,400 wounded, and 100 captured. Fatalities among French general officers were Lieutenant Generals d'Affry, Lannion, and Pezé, Mestre de camp Chaste, and Brigadier Montjeon, while 15 other generals were wounded. Sutton reported that the French admitted sustaining 1,403 killed, 3,445 wounded, and 1,300 captured, or a total of 6,148 casualties. The French believed that they inflicted 9,000 casualties on the Austrians. The official Austrian account reported a total loss of 1,589 killed, 4,164 wounded, 1,659 horses, 5 cannons, and 7 standards. The Austrian cavalry lost 403 killed, 857 wounded, and 194 missing; the infantry lost 1,180 killed and 3,275 wounded; and the artillery lost 6 killed and 32 wounded. (Note: The Austrian total omitted the 194 captured cavalrymen so that the total reported casualties were 5,947 (Gerba, p. 392).)

Coigny described the Austrian army's retreat as a flight and that he ordered a pursuit. However, the pursuit was apparently not carried out with rigor. Königsegg first withdrew to Luzzara then to Motteggiana where the Austrian army stayed while the Allied army remained near Guastalla. Finally, Königsegg's army crossed to the north bank of the Po at Borgoforte on 25 September because it had depleted the forage available on the south bank. The Austrian move was made without hinderance and the Allied army also crossed to the north bank two days later, using their bridges at Guastalla. The Austrian army assumed a strong position behind the Oglio River. Königsegg posted his army covering Mantua and begged for reinforcements.

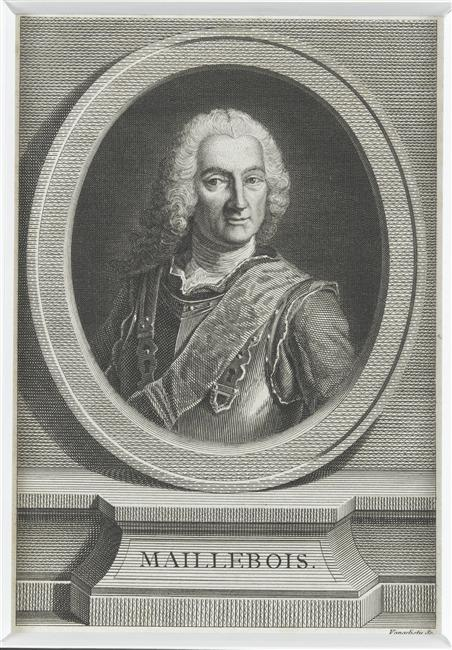
Marquis de Maillebois

Guastalla was the last and bloodiest battle of the war. At first, the French authorities were elated by the victory and Secretary of State for War Nicolas Prosper Bauyn d'Angervilliers sent congratulations to both Coigny and Broglie. However, the French government soon realized that both armies were in almost the same positions as they had been at the start of the campaign. On 2 October, Angervilliers wrote Broglie, "I wish you hadn't lost your equipment, that the enemies hadn't crossed the Secchia, and that there hadn't been a battle at Guastalla; everyone would have benefited!" The bloodshed led both sides to seek a peaceful settlement, but without an immediate resolution.

Maillebois was sent with eight battalions and some cavalry to besiege Mirandola, which was the last Austrian foothold on the south bank of the Po. Königsegg sent a strong force to relieve Mirandola and Maillebois was forced to retreat with the loss of all his artillery. Coigny tried and failed to cross the Po at Borgoforte, then pulled the French forces back behind the Adda River in November. Because operations extended into January, the Allied soldiers suffered a lot of illness. Frustrated with the lack of support from Charles Emmanuel, Coigny left the army and transferred to the German theater of operations in 1735.

Following the Allied gains of 1733, the two sides had, between this battle and that at San Pietro, killed or wounded about 12,000 men, and the 1734 campaign ended about where it began. Marshal de Broglie observed that if the battle had not been fought, the world would have been the winner.

== Notes ==
Footnotes

Citations
