= War of the Polish Succession =

18th century Succession wars for the Polish Commonwealth

- Part of the French–Habsburg rivalry
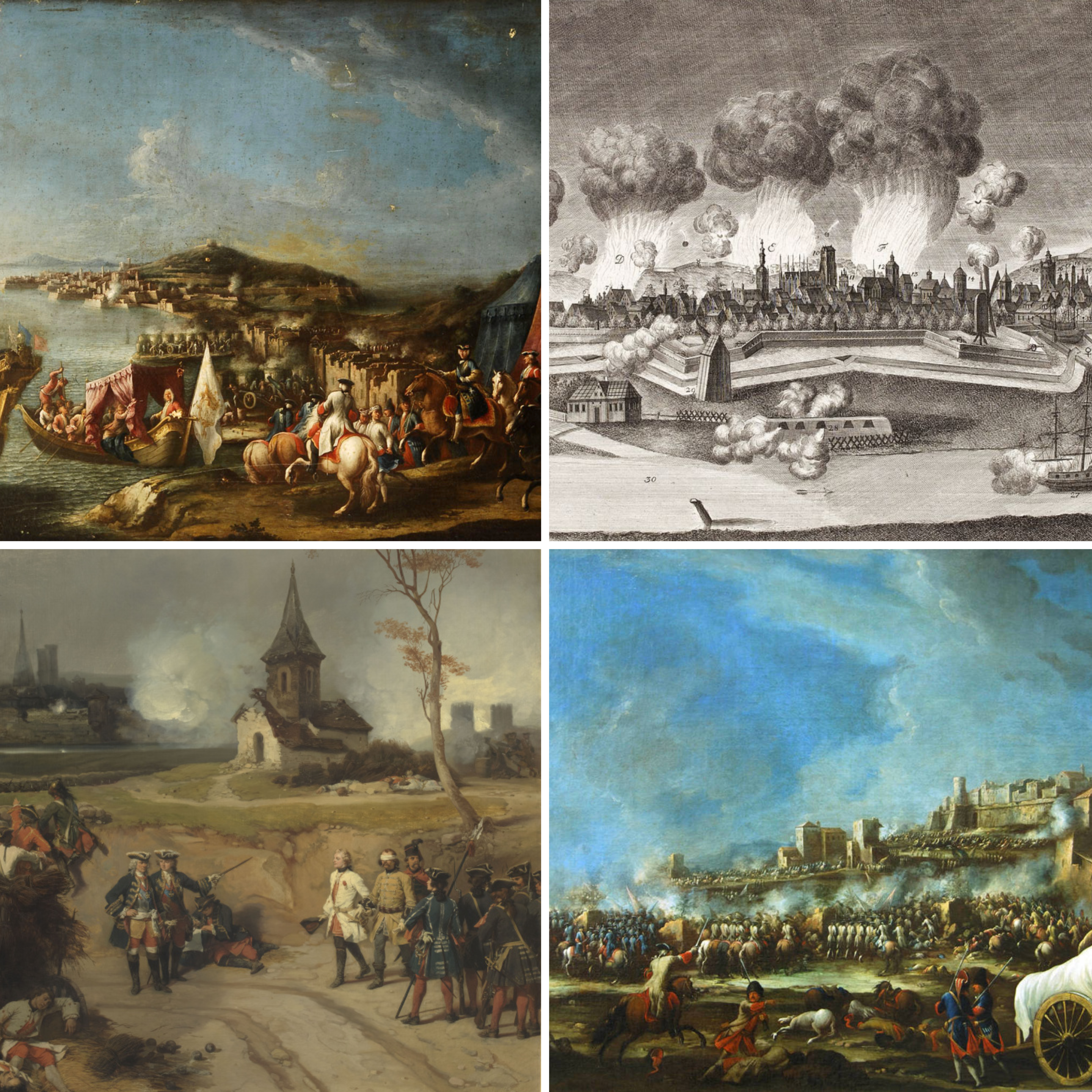
- Clockwise, from top left: Siege of Gaeta (8 April – 6 August 1734); Siege of Danzig (26 May – 18 July 1734); Siege of Philippsburg (22 February – 30 June 1734); Battle of Bitonto (25 May 1734)
Date	10 October 1733 – 3 October 1735 (1 year, 11 months, 3 weeks and 2 days)
Location	Poland, Rhineland, Italy
Result	Treaty of Vienna
Territorial changes	Austria loses the crowns of Naples and Sicily to Charles of Parma; Duchy of Lorraine to Stanislaus Leszczyński (Passed to France following death with guarantee); Duchy of Parma to Austria; Grand Duchy of Tuscany to Francis Stephen; Poland loses direct control over the Duchy of Courland and Semigallia

Belligerents
Poland loyal to Stanislaus I; France; Spain; (Duchy of Savoy) Savoy-Sardinia; Duchy of Parma	Poland loyal to Augustus III; Russia; Habsburg Monarchy; Holy Roman Empire (from 1734); Saxony; Prussia

Commanders and leaders
Stanisław Leszczyński; Jan Tarło; Adam Tarło; (Duchy of Parma) Charles I; (Kingdom of France) Duke of Berwick †; (Kingdom of France) Duke of Villars; (Kingdom of France) de Coigny; (Kingdom of France) Duke of Broglie; (Kingdom of France) Duke of Belle-Isle; (Spain) James Fitz-James; (Spain) Duke of Montemar; (Duchy of Savoy) Charles Emmanuel III	Augustus Wettin; (Russian Empire) Peter Lacy; (Russian Empire) von Münnich; (Russian Empire) Thomas Gordon; (Habsburg monarchy) Eugene of Savoy; (Habsburg monarchy) von Seckendorff; (Habsburg monarchy) von Daun; (Habsburg monarchy) Frederick Louis †; (Habsburg monarchy) de Mercy †; (Habsburg monarchy) Johann Adolf II; (Habsburg monarchy) von Königsegg; (Kingdom of Prussia) Frederick William I

Strength
unknown	unknown

Casualties and losses
- 88,000 military deaths

The War of the Polish Succession (Polish: Wojna o sukcesję polską; 1733–35) was a major European conflict sparked by a civil war in the Polish–Lithuanian Commonwealth over the succession to Augustus II the Strong, which the other European powers widened in pursuit of their own national interests. France and Spain, the two Bourbon powers, tested the power of the Austrian Habsburgs in Western Europe, as did the Kingdom of Prussia, whilst Saxony and Russia mobilized to support the eventual victor. The fighting in Poland–Lithuania resulted in the accession of Augustus III, who in addition to Russia and Saxony, was politically supported by the Habsburgs.

The war's major military campaigns and battles occurred outside the borders of Poland–Lithuania. The Bourbons, supported by Charles Emmanuel III of Sardinia, moved against isolated Habsburg territories. In the Rhineland, France successfully took the Duchy of Lorraine, and in Italy, Spain regained control over the kingdoms of Naples and Sicily lost in the War of the Spanish Succession, while territorial gains in northern Italy were limited despite bloody campaigning. Great Britain's unwillingness to support Habsburg Austria demonstrated the infirmity of the Anglo-Austrian Alliance.

Although a preliminary peace was reached in 1735, the Treaty of Vienna (1738) ended the war formally, which confirmed Augustus III as king of Poland and his opponent Stanisław Leszczyński was awarded the Duchy of Lorraine and Duchy of Bar, then both fiefs of the Holy Roman Empire. Francis Stephen, the duke of Lorraine, was given the Grand Duchy of Tuscany in compensation for losing Lorraine. The Duchy of Parma went to Austria whereas Charles of Parma took the crowns of Naples and Sicily. The Bourbons won most territorial gains, as the Duchies of Lorraine and Bar went from being the Holy Roman Empire's fiefs to those of France, while the Spanish Bourbons gained two new kingdoms: Naples and Sicily. For their part, the Austrian Habsburgs received two Italian duchies in return, though Parma would soon revert to the Bourbons. Tuscany would be held by the Habsburgs until the Napoleonic era.

The war proved disastrous for Polish–Lithuanian independence, and re-affirmed that the affairs of the Poland–Lithuania, including the election of its ruler, were controlled by the other great powers of Europe. After August III, there would only be one more king of Poland, Stanisław August Poniatowski, himself a Russian puppet, and ultimately Poland–Lithuania would be divided up by its neighbors and cease to exist as a sovereign state by the end of the 18th century. Poland–Lithuania also surrendered claims to Livonia and direct control over the Duchy of Courland and Semigallia, which, although remaining its fief, was not integrated into it and fell under strong Russian influence that only ended with the fall of the Russian Empire in 1917.

== Background ==
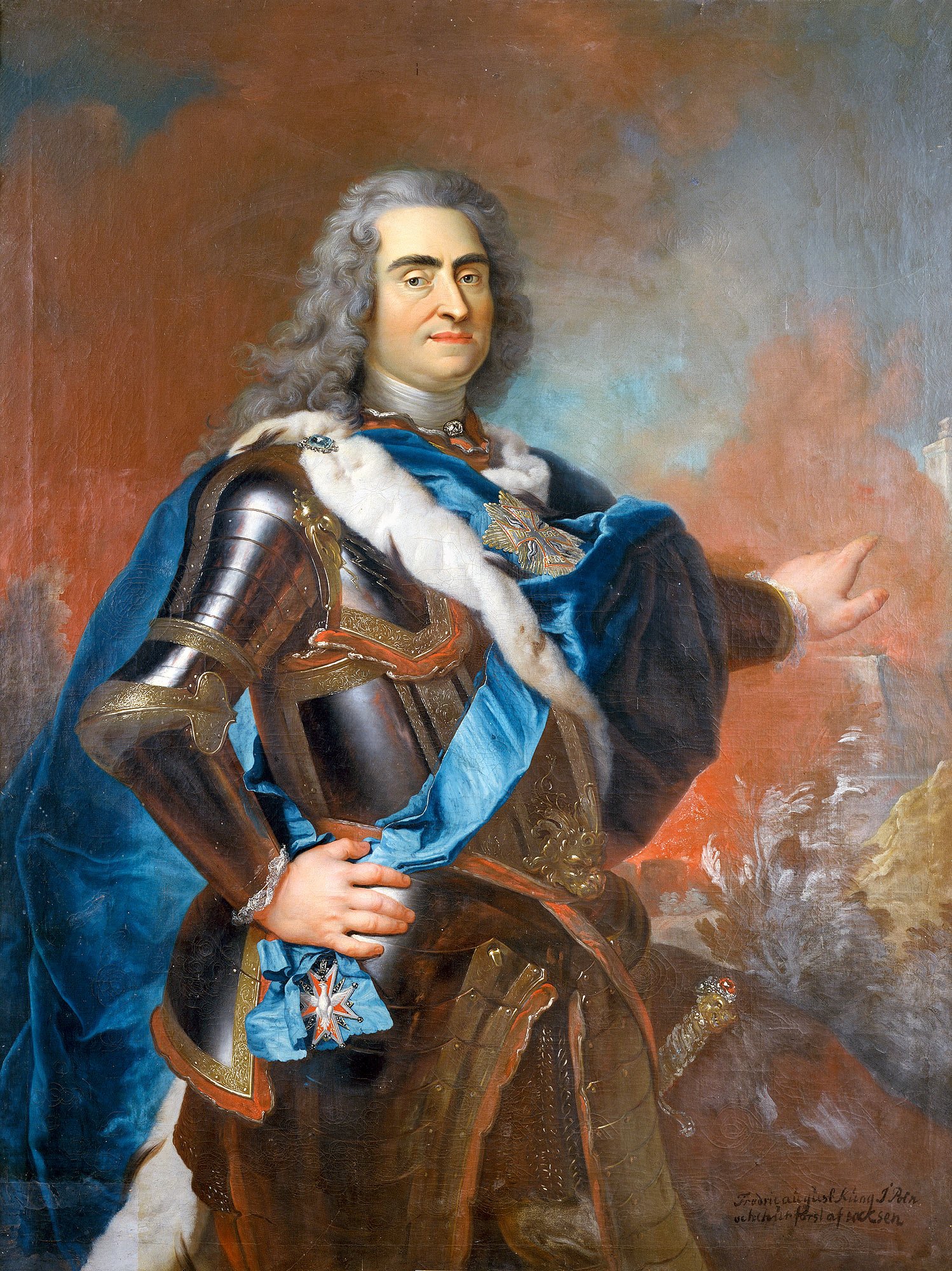
Augustus II; his death in February 1733 sparked the war

After the death of Sigismund II Augustus in 1572, the King of Poland and Grand Duke of Lithuania was elected by the szlachta, a body composed of the Polish–Lithuanian nobility, in a specially called election sejm. The Sejm, the legislative body of the Polish–Lithuanian Commonwealth, increasingly restricted royal power. In turn, the Sejm was often paralyzed by the liberum veto, the right of any member to block its decisions. The Commonwealth's neighbors often influenced the Sejm, and by the early 18th century the democratic system was in decline. From this point, certain foreign powers, especially Russia, became increasingly involved in Polish affairs.

In 1697, Augustus II became king due to Austrian and Russian backing. Deposed by Stanisław Leszczyński in 1705, he returned four years later and Stanisław fled to France, where his daughter Marie Leszczyńska against all odds married Louis XV in 1725. Augustus failed in an attempt to settle the Polish crown on his son, Augustus III, leading to a contest for the throne when he died in 1733. In the secret 1732 Treaty of the Three Black Eagles, Russia, Austria and Prussia agreed to oppose the election of either Stanislaus or Augustus III and to support Manuel of Portugal instead.

The dispute coincided with the breakdown of the Anglo-French Alliance that dominated Europe since 1714. The Peace of Utrecht ensured the separation of France and Spain despite the close relationship between Louis XV and his uncle Philip V of Spain and the two countries were opponents in the War of the Quadruple Alliance (1718–1720). When Cardinal Fleury became French chief minister in 1726, he sought a closer relationship with Spain, helped by the birth of Louis, Dauphin of France in 1729, which seemed to ensure that the countries would remain separate.

Fleury supported Stanisław, hoping to weaken Austria and secure the Duchy of Lorraine, a strategic possession occupied by France for large parts of the previous century. The current duke Francis Stephen was expected to marry Emperor Charles' heir Maria Theresa, bringing Austria dangerously close to France. Simultaneously, Philip wanted to regain the Italian territories ceded to Austria in 1714, which led to the Franco-Spanish Pacte de Famille in 1733.

== Death of Augustus II ==
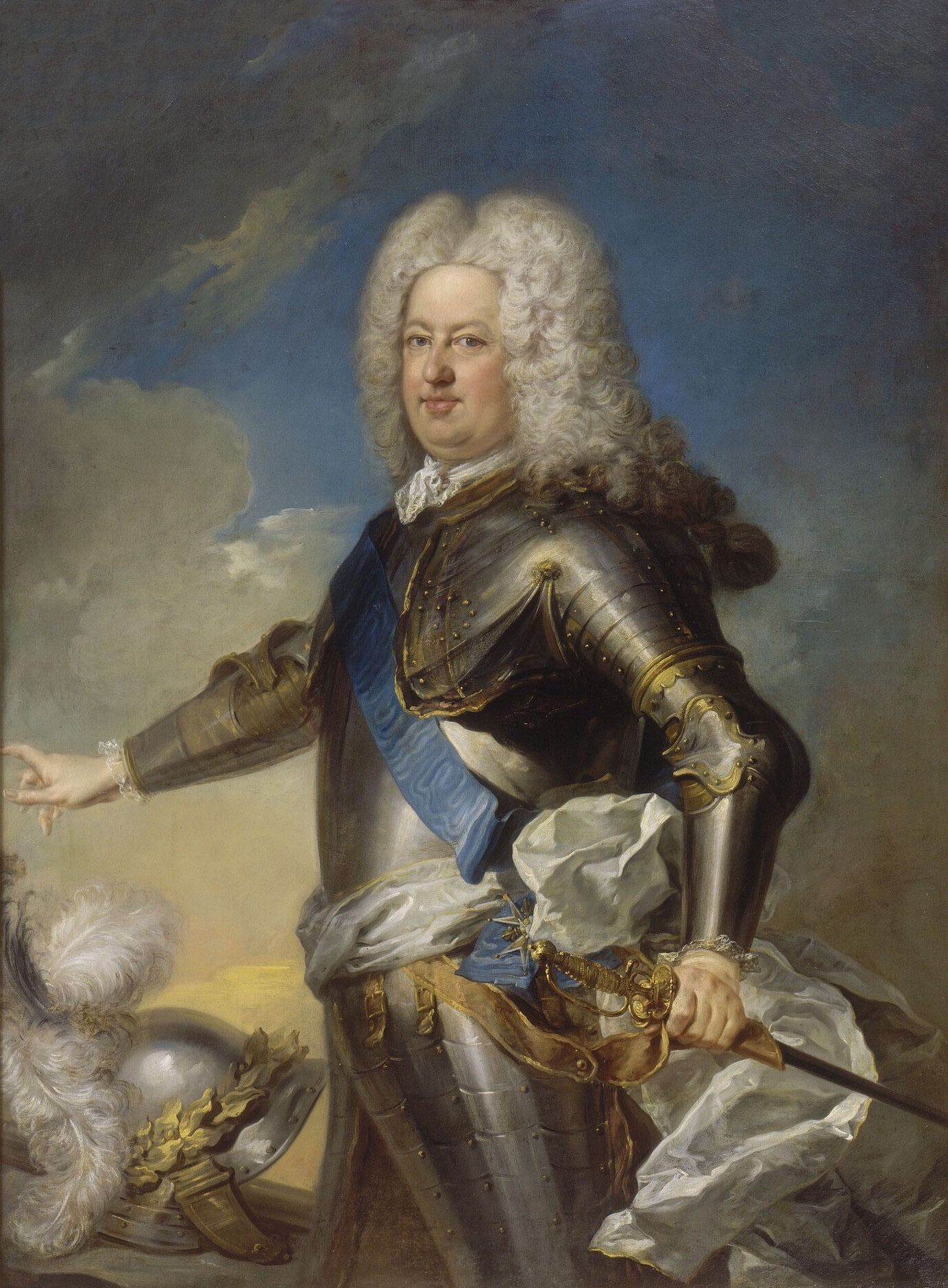
Stanisław Leszczyński, painting by Jean-Baptiste van Loo

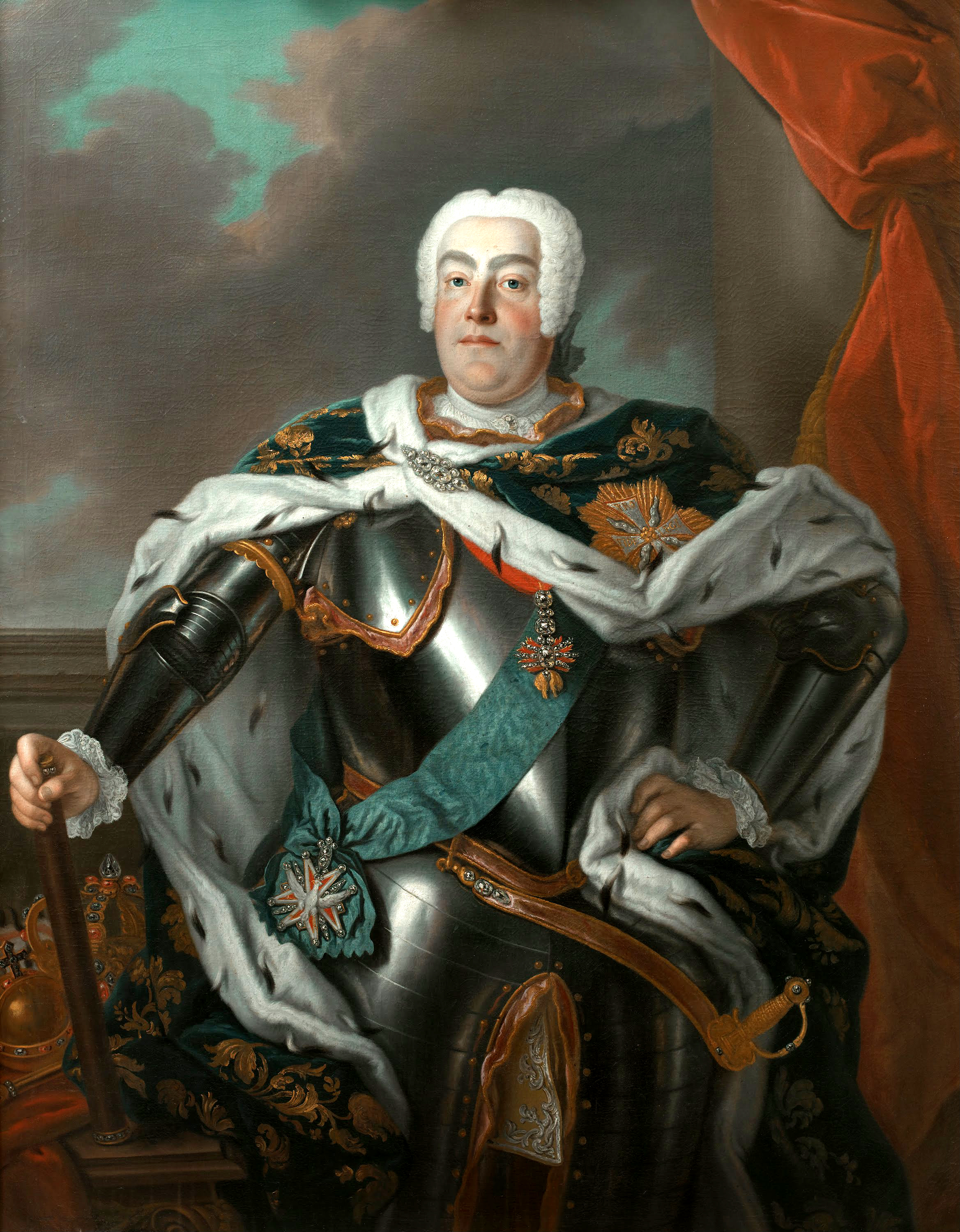
Augustus III of Poland, painting by Louis de Silvestre

Augustus II died on 1 February 1733. Throughout the spring and summer of 1733, France built up its forces along its northern and eastern frontiers, while the emperor massed troops on the Commonwealth's borders, reducing garrisons in the Duchy of Milan for the purpose. While the aging Prince Eugene of Savoy had recommended a more warlike posture to the emperor against potential French actions in the Rhine valley and northern Italy, only minimal steps were taken to improve imperial defenses on the Rhine.

The Marquis de Monti, France's ambassador in Warsaw, convinced the rival Potocki and Czartoryski families to unite behind Stanisław. Teodor Andrzej Potocki, Primate of Poland and interrex following Augustus' death, called a convocation sejm in March 1733. Delegates to this sejm passed a resolution forbidding the candidacy of foreigners; this would explicitly exclude both Emmanuel of Portugal and Augustus II's son, Frederick August II, the Elector of Saxony.

Frederick August negotiated agreements with Austria and Russia in July 1733. In exchange for Russian support, he agreed to give up any remaining Polish claims to Livonia, and promised to Anna of Russia her choice of successor to the Duchy of Courland, a Polish fief (of which she had been duchess prior to her ascension to the Russian throne) which would have otherwise come under direct Polish rule on the death of the current duke, Ferdinand Kettler, who had no heirs. To the Austrian emperor he promised recognition of the Pragmatic Sanction of 1713, a document designed to guarantee inheritance of the Austrian throne to Maria Theresa, Charles' oldest child.

In August, Polish nobles gathered for the election sejm. On 11 August, 30,000 Russian troops under Field Marshal Peter Lacy entered Poland in a bid to influence the sejm's decision. On September 4, France openly declared its support for Leszczyński, who was elected king by a sejm of 12,000 delegates on September 12. A group of nobles, led by Lithuanian magnates including Duke Michael Wiśniowiecki (the former Lithuanian grand chancellor nominated by Augustus II), crossed the Vistula river and the protection of Russian troops. This group, numbering about 3,000, elected Frederick August II King of Poland as Augustus III on October 5. Despite the fact that this group was a minority, Russia and Austria, intent on maintaining their influence within Poland, recognised Augustus as king.

On 10 October, France declared war on Austria and Saxony. Louis XV was later joined by his uncle, King Philip V of Spain, who hoped to secure territories in Italy for his sons by his second marriage to Elizabeth Farnese. Specifically, he hoped to secure Mantua for the elder son, Don Carlos, who was already Duke of Parma and had the expectation of the Grand Duchy of Tuscany, and the Kingdoms of Naples and Sicily for the younger son, Don Felipe. The two Bourbon monarchs were also joined by Charles Emmanuel III of Sardinia, who hoped to secure gains from the Austrian duchies of Milan and Mantua.

=== Austrian isolation ===
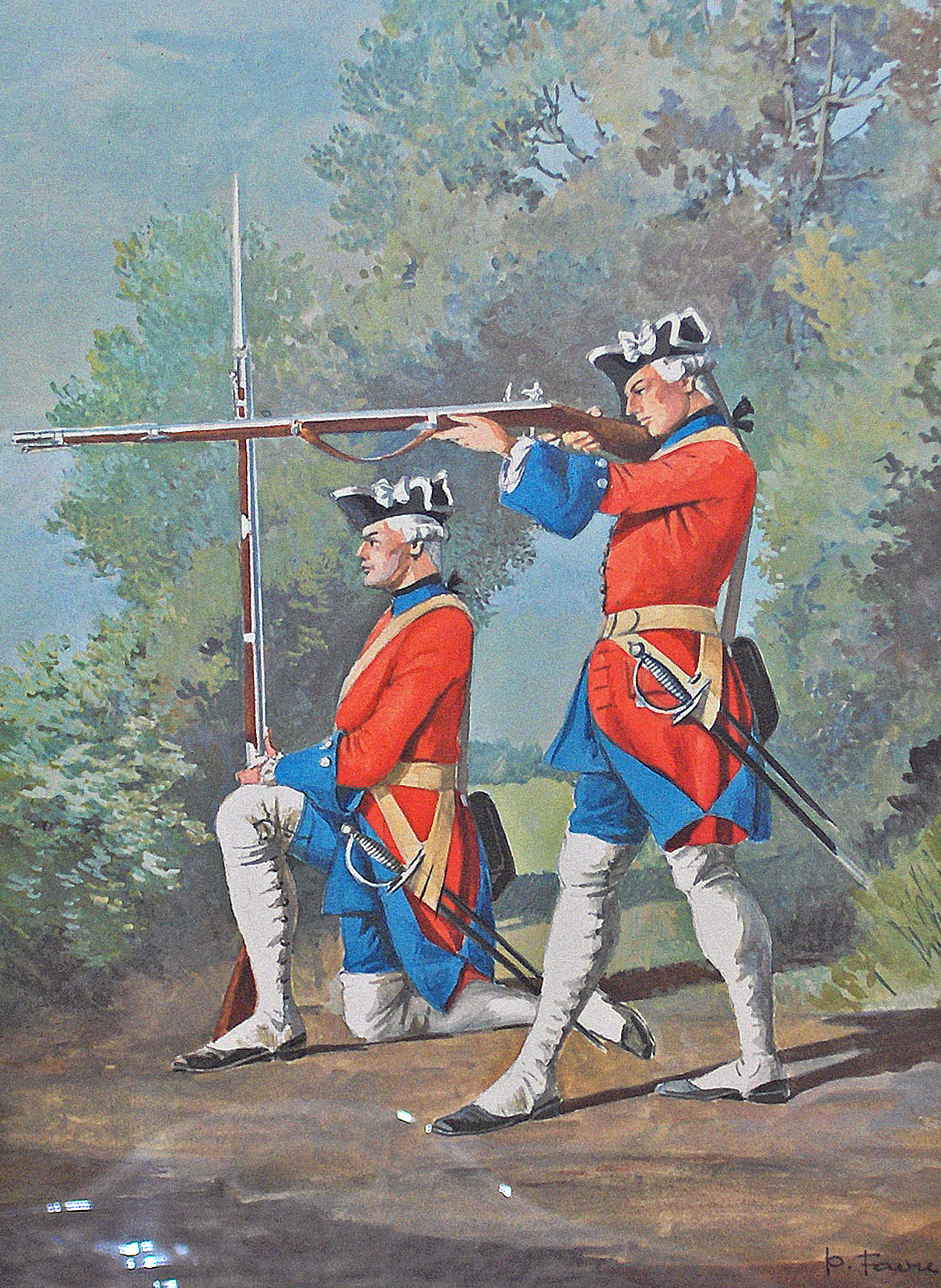
French Royal Army fusiliers in 1735

When hostilities finally broke out, the Austrians had hoped for aid from Great Britain and the Dutch Republic. Such expectations quickly dissipated as both the Dutch and the British chose to pursue a policy of neutrality. British Prime Minister Sir Robert Walpole justified British neutrality in the conflict by noting that the Anglo-Austrian Alliance agreed at the 1731 Treaty of Vienna was a purely defensive agreement, while Austria was in this instance the aggressor. This position was attacked by British Austrophiles who wanted to aid the Austrians against France, but Walpole's dominant position ensured that Britain stayed out of the conflict.

The Dutch under the leadership of Grand Pensionary Simon van Slingelandt mediated between the parties, but were anxious themselves to not have war on their doorstep again. The heavy toll of the previous wars against France on the Dutch economy was still in fresh memory. In early 1733, it appeared that the Dutch Republic was on the verge of war with Prussia. Emperor Charles VI exerted pressure on Prussia, aiming to align the Republic with Austria. However, this attempt proved unsuccessful as the Dutch chose to remain neutral. The threat of war still forced the Dutch Republic to increase the size of its army, just at a time the Dutch had hoped to be able to reduce it appreciably. The French had no wish to provoke Britain and the Dutch Republic and carefully chose not to campaign in the Austrian Netherlands, where Dutch States Army troops garrisoned several fortresses, while also avoiding the parts of the Holy Roman Empire that might draw either power into the conflict.

On Austria's southern border, France in November 1733 negotiated the secret Treaty of Turin with Charles Emmanuel and prepared for military operations in northern Italy. It concluded the (also secret) Treaty of the Escorial with Spain, which included promises of French assistance in the Spanish conquest of Naples and Sicily. France also made diplomatic overtures to Sweden and the Ottoman Empire in a fruitless attempt to draw them into the conflict in support of Stanisław.

The Austrians were thus left largely without effective external allies on their southern and western frontiers. Their Russian and Saxon allies were occupied with the Polish campaign, and the Emperor distrusted Frederick William I of Prussia, who was willing to provide some aid. Divisions within the empire also affected the raising of troops in 1733, as Charles-Albert of Bavaria, who harbored ambitions to become the next Holy Roman Emperor, signed a secret agreement with France in November 1733, and tried, with limited success, to dissuade other rulers within the empire from the Wittelsbach family from providing troops to the emperor under their treaty obligations. While Britain itself did not provide support, the Electorate of Hanover, where George II also ruled as an Imperial Elector, proved willing to help. On 9 April 1734, a Reichskrieg (imperial war) was declared against France, obliging all imperial states to participate.

== War ==
=== Poland ===
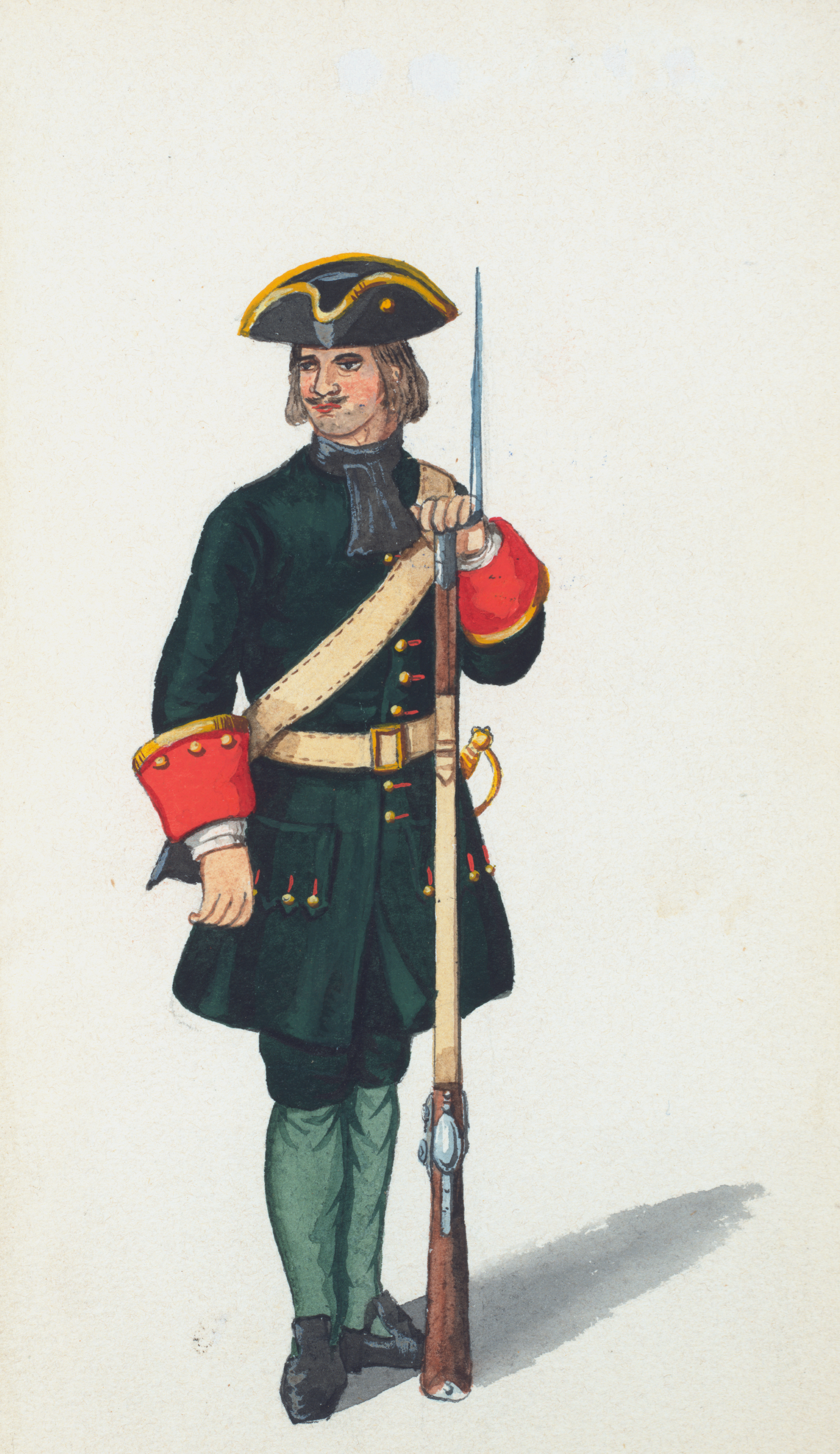
An Imperial Russian Army infantryman of the period

The Russians, commanded by Peter Lacy, quickly captured the capital city of Warsaw and installed Augustus as potential heir, forcing Stanisław to flee to Danzig (present-day Gdańsk), where he was besieged for some time by a Russian-Saxon army that came under the overall command of Field Marshal Burkhard Christoph von Münnich. Danzig capitulated in June 1734, and Stanisław was forced to flee once more, this time first to the city of Königsberg and eventually to France. This ended major military activity in Poland itself, although it continued to be occupied by foreign troops as Augustus dealt with partisan supporters of Stanisław. A group of nobles and aristocrats supporting Stanisław formed the Confederation of Dzików in late 1734, and under their commander, Adam Tarło, tried to fight the Russian and Saxon troops, but their efforts were ineffective. In what became known as the Pacification Sejm, held in June–July 1736, Augustus was confirmed as King of Poland and Grand Duke of Lithuania.

=== Rhineland ===
Following France's 10 October declaration of war, it began military operations three days later, invading the Duchy of Lorraine and besieging the imperial fortress at Kehl, across the Rhine from Strasbourg, gaining control of both objectives in a few weeks. Unable to attack Austria directly, and unwilling to invade the intervening German states for fear of drawing Great Britain and the Dutch into the conflict, France consolidated its position in Lorraine, and withdrew its troops across the Rhine for the winter.

The emperor mobilized his active forces in response to the French attacks, and began the process of calling up the Army of the Holy Roman Empire, establishing a defensive line at Ettlingen, near Karlsruhe. In the spring of 1734 French maneuvers successfully flanked this line, and Prince Eugene of Savoy was forced to withdraw these forces to the imperial encampment at Heilbronn. This cleared the way for the French army under the Duke of Berwick to besiege the imperial fort at Philippsburg, which fell after a siege of two months in July 1734. Eugene, who was accompanied by Crown Prince Frederick of Prussia, made some attempts to relieve the siege, but never made any decisive attacks against the besieging army owing to its size and the relatively poor quality of the troops under his command. Berwick was killed by a shell at Philippsburg.

French armies continued to advance along the Rhine, reaching as far as Mainz, but the growing imperial army, which came to include troops from Russia that had assisted with the capture of Danzig, was able to prevent France from establishing a siege there, and Eugene went on the offensive. A force of 30,000 under Friedrich Heinrich von Seckendorff crossed the Rhine and began pushing the French back toward Trier, defeating them at Clausen in October 1735, in one of the last battles before preliminary peace terms were reached.

=== Northern Italy ===
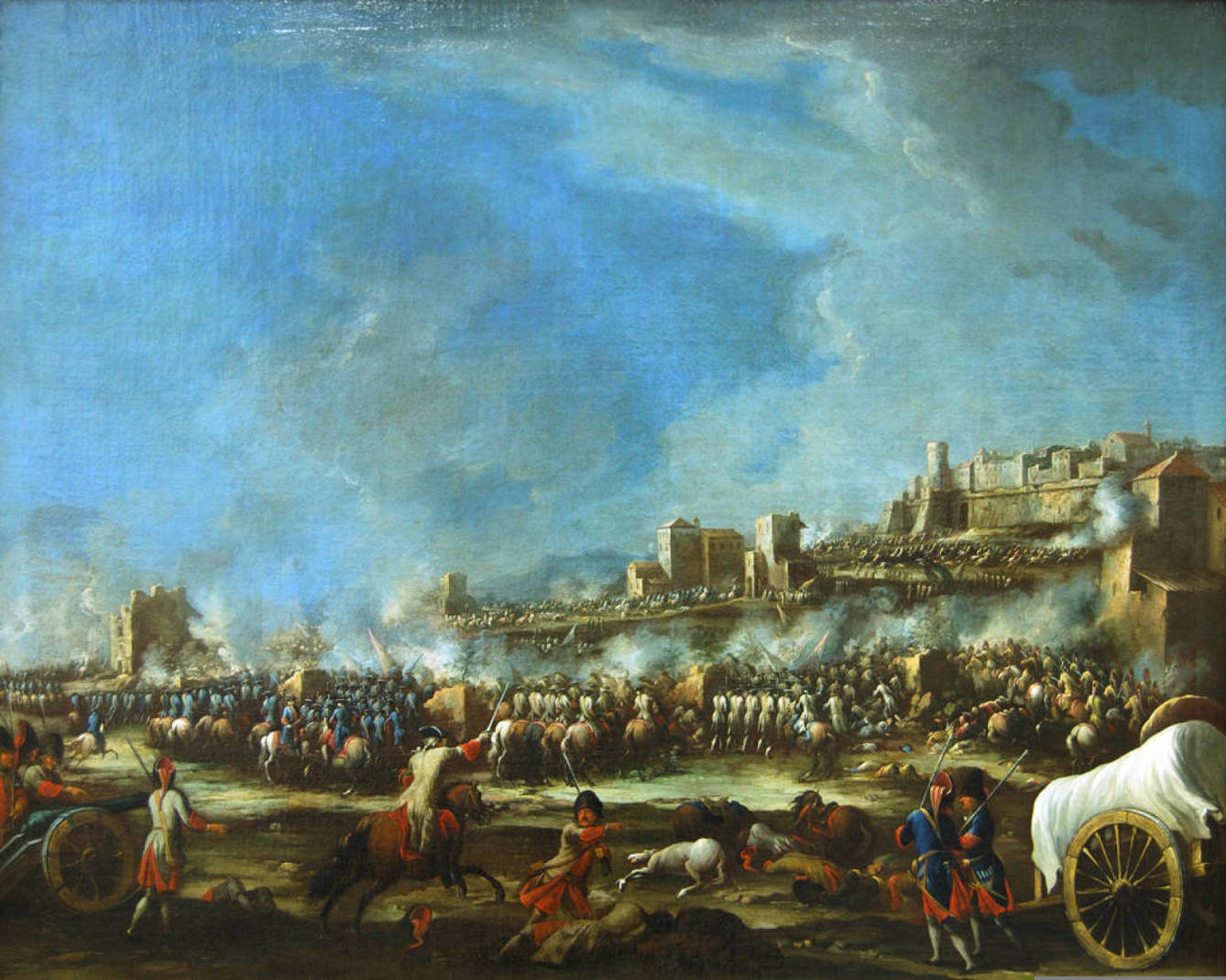
A painting of the Battle of Bitonto by Giovanni Luigi Rocco

French and Savoyard troops numbering over 50,000, under the command of Charles Emmanuel, entered Milanese territory as early as 10 October, against minimal resistance, as the Austrian forces in the duchy numbered only about 12,000. By 3 November, the city of Milan itself had surrendered, although the Austrian governor, Count Wirich Philipp von Daun, still held the fortress. France's great general, the Duke de Villars, joined Charles Emmanuel in Milan on 11 November. While Villars wanted to move immediately against Mantua to secure the Alpine passes against Austrian reinforcements, Charles Emmanuel, mistrustful of his French allies and their dealings with Spain, sought to secure Milan. The army spent the next three months eliminating Austrian opposition from the remaining fortified towns in the duchy. Villars attempted to interest Don Carlos of Parma in joining the expedition against Mantua, but Carlos was focused on the campaign into Naples. Villars began to move against Mantua, but Charles Emmanuel resisted, and the army made little progress. In early May, an Austrian army of 40,000 under Count Claude Florimond de Mercy crossed the Alps and threatened to close in on the French army's rear by a flanking maneuver. Villars responded by abandoning his advance on Mantua and attempted to interrupt the Austrian army's crossing of the Po. Villars, frustrated by Charles Emmanuel's delaying tactics and refusual to cooperate, quit the army on May 27. He fell ill on the way back to France and died in Turin on 17 June.

Mercy's forces made repeated attempts to cross the Parma river in June, but it was not until late in that month that they were able to cross the river and approach the city of Parma, where the allied forces, now under the command of French marshals de Broglie and Coigny, were entrenched. In the Battle of Colorno and in a bloody battle near the village of Crocetta on 29 June, the Austrians were beaten back, Mercy was killed, and Frederick of Württemberg, his second, was wounded. Charles Emmanuel returned the next day to retake command, and resumed his delaying tactics by failing to immediately pursue the retreating Austrians. The Austrians retreated to the Po, where they were reinforced by additional troops and placed under the command of Field Marshal Königsegg. After two months of inaction, during which the armies faced each other across the Secchia river, Königsegg on September 15 took advantage of relaxed security and executed a raid on Coigny's headquarters at Quistello, very nearly capturing Coigny and taking among other prizes Charles Emmanuel's china. Two days later the French withdrew to a position near Guastalla in response to Austrian maneuvers, but one detachment of nearly 3,000 men was surrounded and captured by the advancing Austrians. On 19 September, Königsegg attacked the allied position at Guastalla, and in another bloody encounter, was beaten back, losing among others Frederick of Württemberg. Königsegg retreated across the Po, adopting a defensive position between the Po and the Oglio while Charles Emmanuel again did not capitalize on his victory. When he finally withdrew most of the allied army to Cremona, the Austrians advanced on the north bank of the Po as far as the Adda before both armies entered winter quarters in December 1734.

=== Southern Italy ===
In southern Italy, the Austrians, choosing a strategy of defending a large number of fortresses, were soundly defeated. Don Carlos assembled an army composed primarily of Spaniards, but also including some troops from France and Savoy. Moving south through the Papal States, his army flanked the frontline Austrian defense at Mignano, forcing them to retreat into the fortress at Capua. He was then practically welcomed into Naples by the city fathers, as the Austrian viceroy had fled toward Bari, and the fortresses held by the Austrians in the city were quickly captured. While maintaining a blockade of the largest Austrian fortresses at Capua and Gaeta, a large portion of the allied army gave chase to the remaining Austrian forces. These finally attempted a stand in late May, and were defeated at Bitonto. Capua and Gaeta were then properly besieged while Austrian fortresses in Sicily were quickly subdued. Gaeta surrendered in August, and Capua held out until November when its commander, Otto Ferdinand von Abensberg und Traun, finally negotiated surrender terms when he ran out of ammunition. The Jacobite pretender's heir, Charles Edward Stuart, who was under 14 then, also participated in the French and Spanish Siege of Gaeta, making his first exposure to battle.

The armies in northern Italy suffered significantly over the winter, with significant losses to disease and desertion. For the 1735 campaign the allied forces in northern Italy came under the command of the Duke de Noailles, elevated to Marshal after his successful contributions to the Rhine campaign. They were also joined by Spanish forces in May, now available after the successes in the south. In response to this threat, Königsegg retreated into the Bishopric of Trent, but leaving the fortress city of Mantua well-defended. At this point divisions between the allies became clear, as Spain laid claim to Mantua, and also refused to guarantee Milan to Charles Emmanuel. In response, Charles Emmanuel refused to allow his siege equipment to be used against Mantua. As a result, the Franco-Spanish army was unable to do more than blockade the city. When Charles Emmanuel withdrew his forces from the area, the allies were forced to retreat, and the beleaguered Austrians capitalized, eventually recovering most of Milan against little opposition in November.

== Peace settlement ==
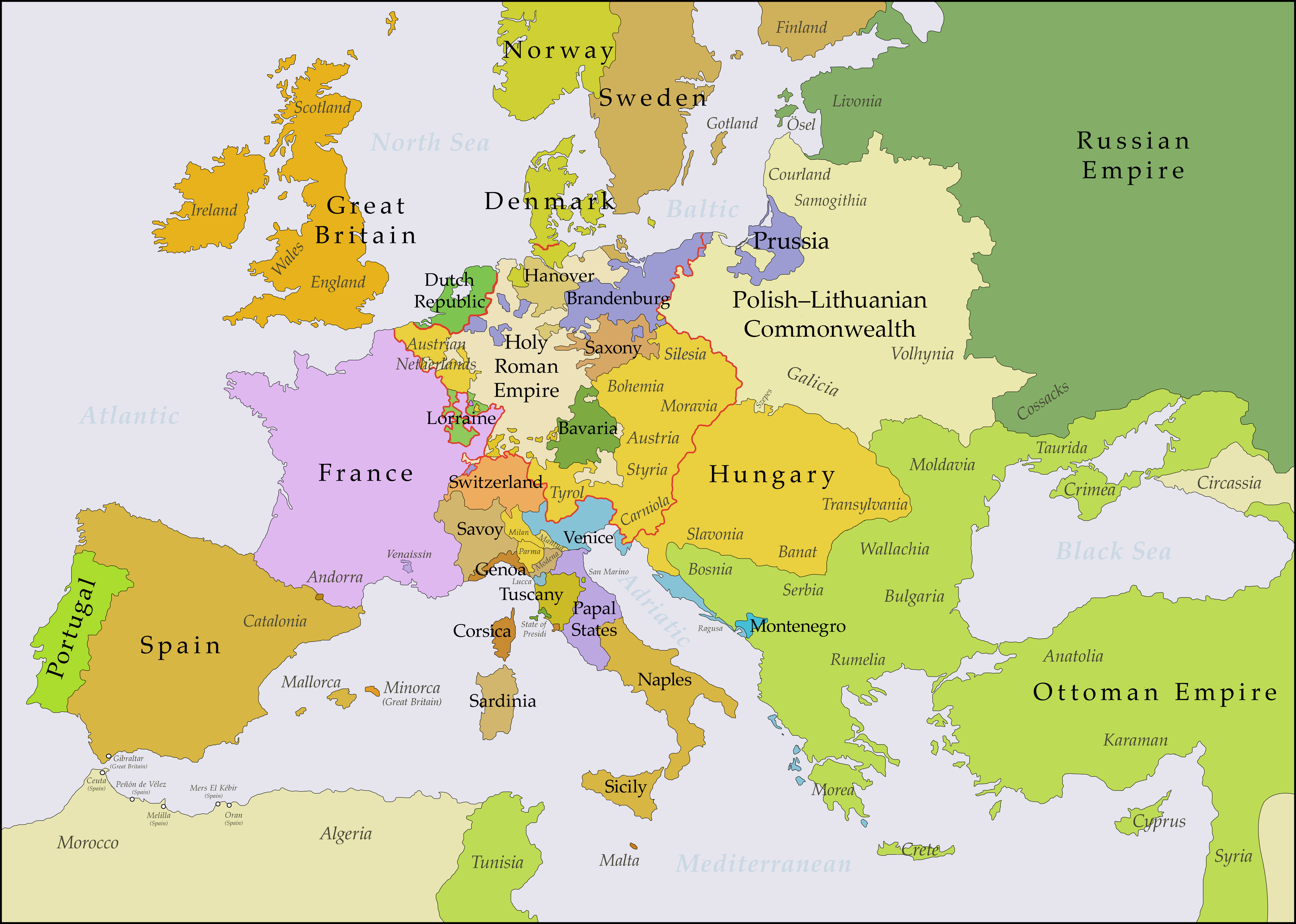
Europe after the 1738 Treaty of Vienna, which concluded the war

As early as February 1734 the British and Dutch had offered to mediate peace talks between the various parties of the conflict. By early 1735, proposals were being circulated. As 1735 progressed with the Austrians being in no real position to continue the fight, and the French concerned by the possible arrival of Russian reinforcements on the Rhine (which did eventually occur), negotiations continued through the summer of 1735.

A preliminary peace was finally concluded in October 1735 and ratified in the Treaty of Vienna in November 1738. Augustus was officially confirmed as king of Poland, Stanisław was compensated with Lorraine (which would pass on his death, through his daughter, to the French), while the former Duke of Lorraine, Francis Stephen, was made heir to the Grand Duchy of Tuscany.

Charles of Parma gave up Parma, which came under Austrian rule, and renounced his rights as heir to the Grand Duchy of Tuscany, but was compensated by being confirmed as king of Naples and Sicily. Charles Emmanuel III of Sardinia received territories in the western part of the Duchy of Milan west of the Ticino, including Novara and Tortona.

Although fighting stopped after the preliminary peace in 1735, the final peace settlement had to wait until the death of the last Medici Grand Duke of Tuscany, Gian Gastone in 1737, to allow the territorial exchanges provided for by the peace settlement to go into effect.

The French (and their allies), hoping for détente and good relations with the Austrians, now also recognized the Pragmatic Sanction that would allow Emperor Charles's daughter Maria Theresa to succeed him. This proved a hollow guarantee, however, as the French decided to intervene to partition the Habsburg monarchy after all following the death of Charles in 1740. The acquisition of Lorraine for the former Polish king, however, proved of lasting benefit to France, as it passed under direct French rule with Stanisław's death in 1766.

Stanisław signed the act of abdication in 1736, while Augustus III pronounced a general amnesty. Michał Serwacy Wiśniowiecki was lavishly rewarded: the king made him the Grand Hetman and commander-in-chief of the Grand Duchy of Lithuania.

== See also ==
- War of the Spanish Succession
- War of the Austrian Succession
- List of wars of succession in Europe

== Sources ==
- Chisholm, Hugh, ed. (1911). "Polish Succession War" . Encyclopædia Britannica. Vol. 21 (11th ed.). Cambridge University Press. pp. 981–982.
- Lewinski-Corwin, Edward H (1917). The Political History of Poland. Polish Book Imports.
- Lodge, Richard (1931). "English Neutrality in the War of the Polish Succession". Transactions of the Royal Historical Society. 14: 141–173. doi:10.2307/3678511. JSTOR 3678511. S2CID 155803033.
- Ward, AW; Prothero, GW, eds. (1909). The Cambridge Modern History; Volume VI The 18th century. Cambridge University Press.
- Sutton, John L (1980). The King's honor & the King's Cardinal: the war of the Polish succession. University Press of Kentucky. ISBN 978-0-8131-1417-0.
- Wilson, Peter Hamish (1998). German armies: war and German politics, 1648–1806. Routledge. ISBN 978-1-85728-106-4.
- Austrian-Hungarian Monarchy. Kriegsarchiv (1891). Geschichte des Kämpfe Österreichs: Feldzüge des Prinzen Eugen von Savoyen: Nach den Feldacten und anderen authentischen Quellen [History of Austrian Battles: Campaigns of Prince Eugene of Savoy: from the field records and other authentic sources] (in German). Verlag des K.K. Generalstabes, in Commission bei C. Gerold's Sohn.
- Colletta, Pietro; Horner, Ann Susan (translator) (1858). History of the kingdom of Naples, 1734–1825, with a suppl, Parts 1825–1856.
- Lindsay, J. O (1957). The New Cambridge Modern History. Cambridge, England: Cambridge University Press. ISBN 978-0-521-04545-2.
- Pajol, Charles Pierre (1881). Les guerres sous Louis XV [The Wars of Louis XV] (in French). Paris: Librairie de Firmin-Didot et Cie. p. 288. "Clausen Coigny."
- Navarro i Soriano, Ferran (2019). Harca, harca, harca! Músiques per a la recreació històrica de la Guerra de Successió (1794-1715). Editorial DENES. ISBN 978-84-16473-45-8.
- Van Alphen, Marc; Hoffenaar, Jan; Lemmers, Alan; Van der Spek, Christiaan (2019). Krijgsmacht en Handelsgeest: Om het machtsevenwicht in Europa (in Dutch). Boom. ISBN 978-90-244-3038-3.
- Israel, Jonathan (1995). The Dutch Republic: Its Rise, Greatness and Fall, 1477–1806. Oxford University Press. ISBN 0-19-873072-1.
- Van Nimwegen, Olaf (2002). De Republiek der Verenigde Nederlanden als grote mogendheid: Buitenlandse politiek en oorlogvoering in de eerste helft van de achttiende eeuw en in het bijzonder tijdens de Oostenrijkse Successieoorlog (1740–1748) (in Dutch). De Bataafsche Leeuw. ISBN 90-6707-540-X.
