= Siege of Prague (1742) =

Siege of the War of the Austrian Succession

Coordinates: 50°5′12″N 14°23′14″E

- Part of the War of the Austrian Succession
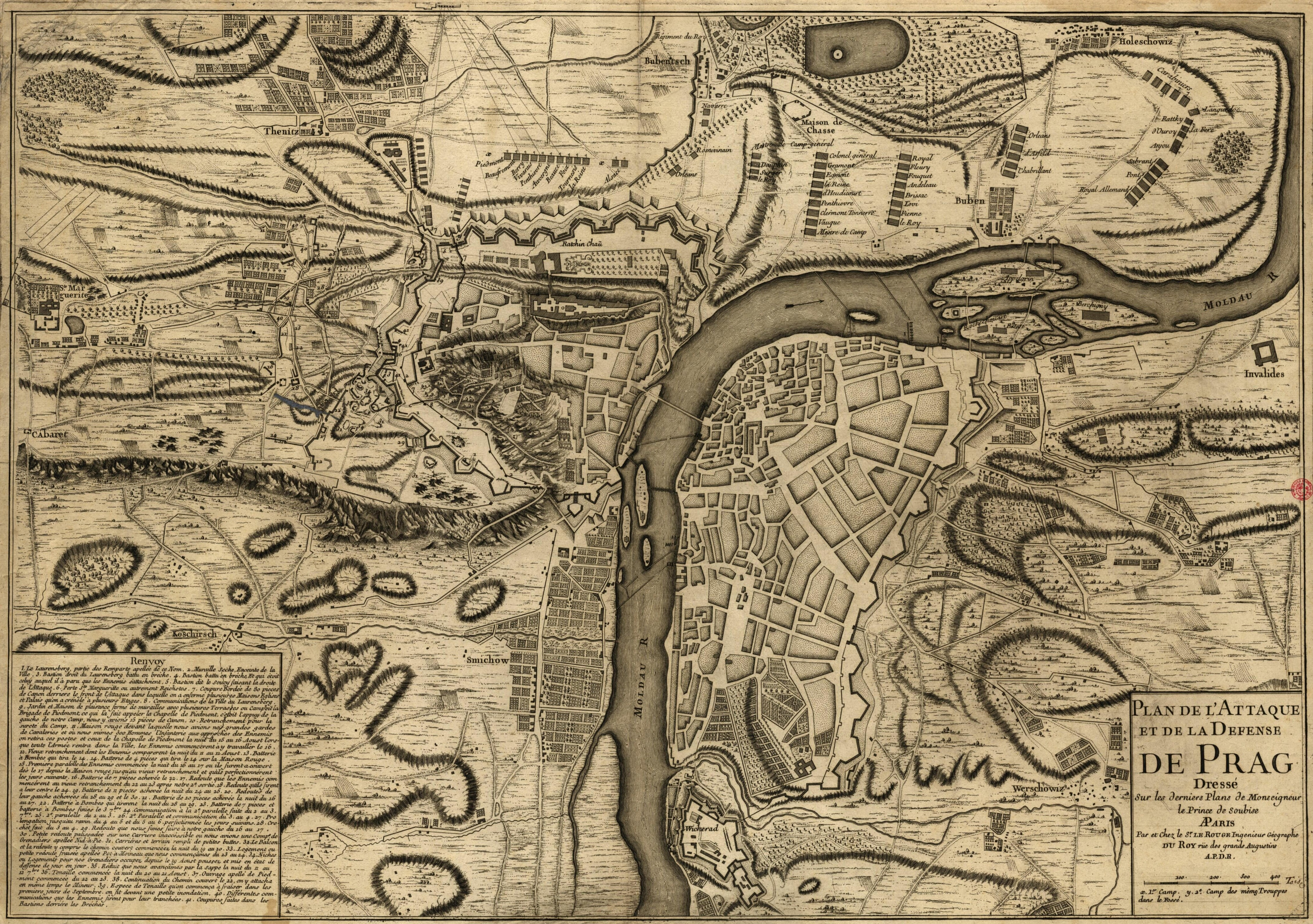
- Austrian attack on Prague held by the French in 1742 (G.-L. Le Rouge, c. 1742)
Date	June–December 1742
Location	Prague, Bohemia
Result	France successfully defends the city but withdraws on 18 December

Belligerents
Austria	France

Commanders and leaders
(Habsburg monarchy) Count Lobkowicz	(Kingdom of France) Duc de Belle-Isle (Kingdom of France) Duc de Broglie

Strength
70,000	25,000

The 1742 siege of Prague was an extended blockade of the Bohemian capital during the War of the Austrian Succession.

== History ==
French forces first under the command of de Broglie were surrounded by a large Austrian army in June 1742. A French relief column forced the Austrians to partially lift the siege in September, at which time de Broglie escaped from the besieged city, leaving it under the command of Belle-Isle. When the Austrians renewed the siege after halting the advance of the French relief, conditions in the city became quite difficult, but the Austrians failed to maintain a tight cordon around the city. On 16 December, Belle-Isle led 14,000 troops out of the city on a ten-day march to the French-held city of Cheb. In wintry conditions, Belle-Isle succeeded in fending off Austrian scouting parties until the army reached the Bohemian Forest four days later.

The Austrian command did not learn of the French departure until 18 December, but believed they had successfully cut off all the routes of escape when Belle-Isle boldly led his army off the road and into the mountains. After a difficult crossing in which weather and disease took a marked toll on the French army, they reached Cheb on 26 December. The 6,000 men, mostly wounded and sick, that Belle-Isle left in Prague afterward successfully negotiated a withdrawal from the city with the honours of war.
