= François Marie de Broglie, 1st Duke of Broglie =

Marshal of France François Marie de Broglie duc de Broglie
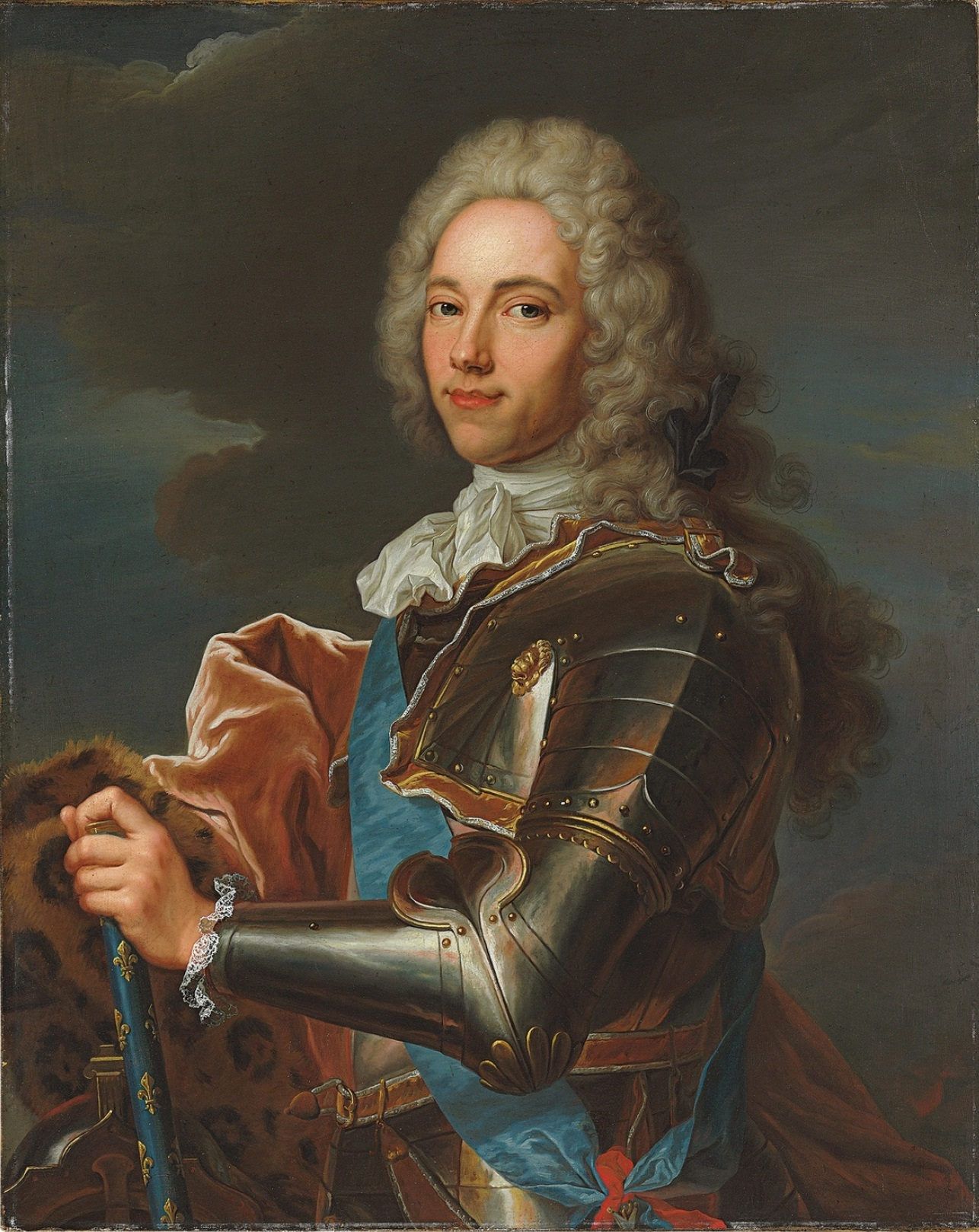
- Portrait by Hyacinthe Rigaud
- Born: 11 January 1671; Paris, France
- Died: 22 May 1745 (aged 74); Broglie, Eure, France
- Military career
- Allegiance: France
- Branch: French Royal Army
- Rank: Marshal of France
- Conflicts: War of Spanish Succession; Battle of Malplaquet; Battle of Denain; War of the Polish Succession; Battle of Parma; Raid on Quistello; Battle of Guastalla; War of the Austrian Succession; Siege of Prague (1742); Battle of Sahay
- Other work: French Ambassador to the Kingdom of Great Britain

François Marie de Broglie, 1st Duke of Broglie (French: [fʁɑ̃swa maʁi də bʁɔj]; 11 January 1671 – 22 May 1745) was a French Royal Army officer and diplomat.

== Biography ==
=== Early years ===
François-Marie de Broglie was the third son of Victor-Maurice, comte de Broglie, named for his grandfather, François Marie. He entered the army at an early age, and had a varied career of active service before he was made, at the age of twenty-three, lieutenant-colonel of the king's regiment of cavalry.

=== Career ===
He served continuously in the War of the Spanish Succession and was present at Malplaquet. He was made lieutenant-general in 1710, and served with Villars in the last campaign of the war and at the Battle of Denain. During the peace he continued in military employment, and in 1719 he was made director-general of cavalry and dragoons. He was also employed in diplomatic missions and was ambassador in England in 1724.

The war in Italy called him into the field again in 1733, and in the following year he was made marshal of France. In the campaign of 1734 he was one of the chief commanders on the French side, and he fought the Battles of Parma and Guastalla. A famous episode was his narrow personal escape when his quarters on the Secchia were raided by the enemy on the night of 14 September 1734, in what became known as the Raid on Quistello.

In 1735 he directed a war of positions with credit, but he was soon replaced by Marshal de Noailles. He was governor-general of Alsace when Frederick the Great paid a secret visit to Strasbourg in 1740.

In 1742, during the War of the Austrian Succession, Broglie was appointed to command the French army in Germany, but the only success obtained was in the action of Sahay (25 May 1742), for which he was created duc de Broglie and made a peer of France.

In 1743 he received orders from the King to take command of the army of Bavaria and Bohemia. He had the courage to resist the orders that compelled him to defend Bavaria, a ravaged country where his troops would have perished as much from famine and disease as from the enemy's sword. After sending eleven couriers to the Court to convey the necessity of a retreat, and receiving no reply, he took it upon himself in July 1743 to bring his army back to the frontier, where he relinquished command to Marshal de Saxe. Sacrificed to ministerial politics, he was exiled to his estate at Broglie, where he died two years later.

== Marriage and children ==
He married on 5 February 1716 Thérèse Gillette Locquet de Grandville, daughter of Charles Locquet, sieur de Granville, a ship-owner from Saint-Malo.
They had :

1. Victor François de Broglie, 2nd Duke of Broglie (1718–1804), Marshal of France
2. Charles François de Broglie, Marquis of Ruffec (1719–1781), diplomat
3. François, Count of Revel (1720–1757), killed at the Battle of Rossbach
4. Charles (1733–1777), Bishop of Noyon
5. Marie-Thérèse (1732–1819), married Louis Charles de Lameth, mother of Charles and Alexandre Lameth.

== Notes ==
French nobility
New creation	Duke of Broglie; 1742–1745	Succeeded by Victor-François de Broglie
