= Dominik von Königsegg-Rothenfels =

Austrian imperial Fieldmarshal (1673–1751)

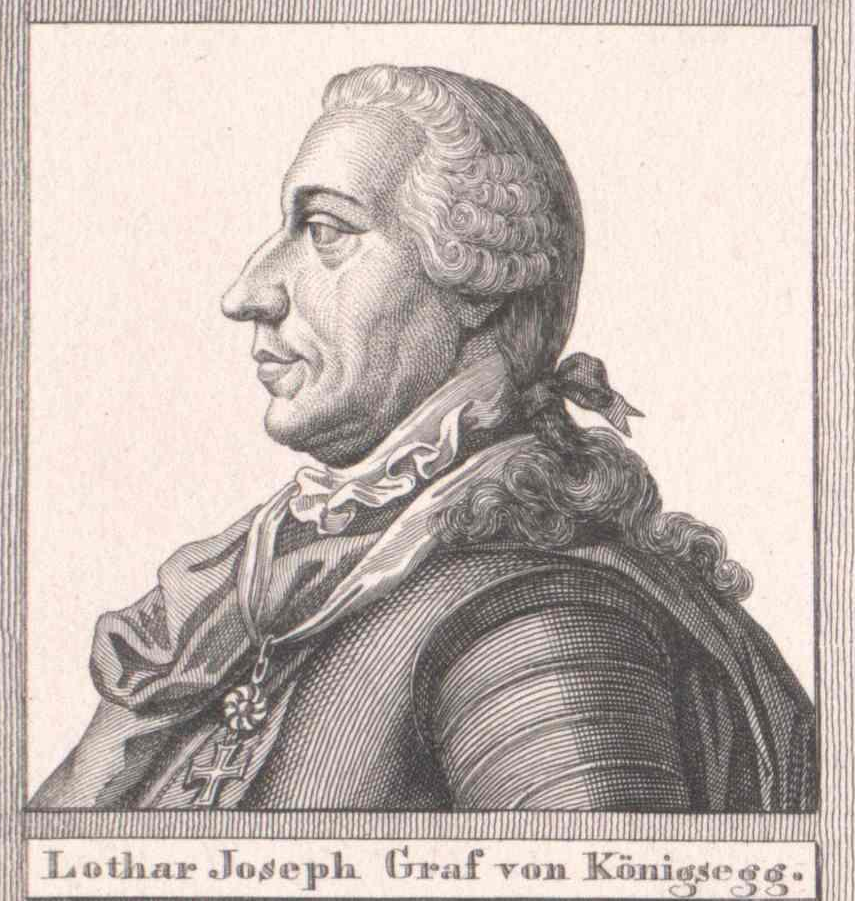
Joseph Lothar von Königsegg-Rothenfels

Lothar Joseph Dominik Graf von Königsegg-Rothenfels (17 May 1673 – Vienna, 8 December 1751) was an Imperial field marshal. During the War of the Polish Succession, he organized the successful raid on Quistello against the Franco-Sardinian army.

== Family ==
Lothar was the youngest son of Count Leopold Wilhelm von Königsegg-Rothenfels and Maria Polyxena, Countess Scherffenberg. He married Marie-Thérese de Lannoy, sister of Eugène-Hyacinthe de Lannoy, 5th Count of la Motterie.

== Career ==
His parents sent him to the Jesuit school in Besançon, to become a priest. At the age of 16 Lothar became capitular in Salzburg and Passau. Then he was sent to Rome to finish his education.
But Lothar didn't want to become a priest, left Rome and joined the Imperial army which was fighting the Turks in Hungary at that time.

He served between 1691 and 1699 in the Cuirassier-Regiment "Hohenzollern" in the war against the Turks. Two years later he participated in the Italian campaign under Prince Eugene of Savoy in the War of Spanish Succession (1701–1714).
On 5 October 1702 he became a Colonel, and received command of his own Infantry regiment. Later he was promoted to Generalfeldwachtmeister and Feldmarschallleutnant.
He distinguished himself in the Battle of Turin (1706) and received command of the fortification of Mantua.
At the end of the war, Lothar played an important role in the negotiations for the Treaty of Rastatt.

Königsegg became commander of the Austrian troops of the newly conquered Habsburg Netherlands, between 1714 and 1717.
Between 1718 and 1722, he served as Ambassador in Paris and Warschau. In 1722 Königsegg became commander in Siebenbürgen, and became Fieldmarshal on 16 October 1723. After that he was a diplomat in The Hague and Madrid.
In 1731, he became a Knight in the Order of the Golden Fleece.

In the War of Polish Succession (1733–1738) he became supreme commander in Italy after the death of Florimund Mercy. He had some successes against French and Spanish troops, but was beaten in the Battle of Guastalla on 19 September 1734.
In 1735, he pulled back to Tyrol and laid down his command. In 1736 Eugen of Savoy died and Königsegg succeeded him as president of the Hofkriegsrat.

In 1735, another war with the Turks had broken out and Königsegg personally assumed command in 1737. The Austrians suffered a defeat and Königsegg was forced to resign from all his military functions.

He was rehabilitated when Maria Theresia came to power and became Oberst-Land- und Hauszeugmeister. In this function he was involved in the negotiations for the withdrawal of the French troops from Prague in 1743 during the War of Austrian Succession (1740–1748).

In 1744, he took up arms one more time and became supreme commander of the troops in the Austrian Netherlands. He led an Austrian Army corps in the Battle of Fontenoy (11 May 1745). He was slightly wounded in the (lost) battle and returned to Vienna, where he became Obersthofmeister.

He died there on 8 December 1751 at the age of 78 without children. He was buried in St. Hieronymus church.
