= Raid on Quistello =

1734 engagement of the War of the Polish Succession

- Part of the War of the Polish Succession
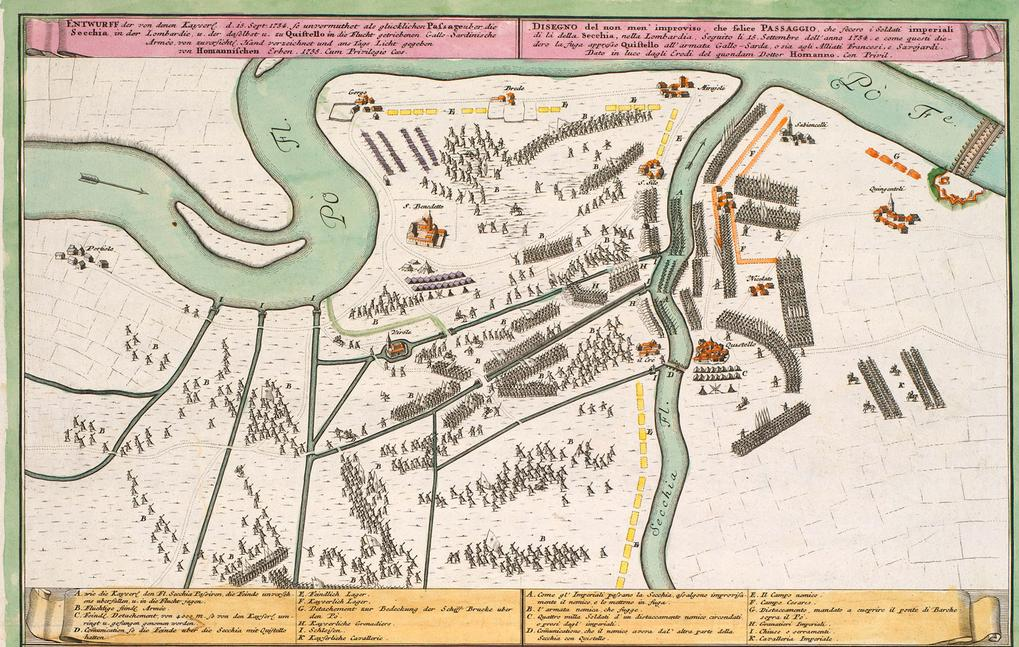
- Crossing the Secchia on 15 September 1734
Date	15 September 1734
Location	Quistello – San Benedetto, northern Italy
Result	Austrian victory

Belligerents
France; Sardinia	Austria

Commanders and leaders
(Kingdom of Sardinia) Charles Emmanuel III (Kingdom of France) François de Broglie	(Habsburg monarchy) Dominik von Königsegg (Habsburg monarchy) Frederick of Württemberg

Strength
40,000	20,000

Casualties and losses
7,100; • 1,100 dead or wounded; • 6,000 missing or captured	900; • 800 dead or wounded; • 100 missing or captured

The Raid on Quistello was a raid and meeting engagement in which the Austrians encountered the Piedmontese and French during the War of the Polish Succession on 15 September 1734. The military engagement took place in the area between Quistello and San Benedetto Val di Sambro in Emilia-Romagna, northern Italy, on the left bank of the Secchia, about 28 kilometres (17 mi) north of Guastalla. Historian Gaston Bodart also referred to it as the Treffen bei Quistello, 'Battle of Quistello'.

== Raid ==
Austrian Field Marshal Dominik von Königsegg decided to attempt a raid. For this, Generalfeldwachtmeister Count Karl von Waldeck was to advance past Quistello on the right to the Secchia River. Lieutenant Field Marshal Johann Lantieri was to cover the camp with three cavalry regiments, while Königsegg himself wanted to attack with General of the Artillery Frederick of Württemberg on the left. Shortly after midnight on 15 September, the columns left the camp. An hour before dawn, they reached the river, and two hours later, the crossing began, still not noticing the sentries. The first column, under Württemberg, missed the ford at Gaillarde but was then spotted by the sentries, who stormed the camp, where great confusion reigned. The second column, under Königsegg, and the third column, under August von Suckow, crossed the river at Casniano and were able to eliminate the outposts. The fourth column, under Waldeck, reached the other bank between Regina della Crema and Madonna del Carmine. Austrian cavalry entered the camp, further increasing the chaos there. Meanwhile, the first column reached the French headquarters, which had still not been informed. Marshal François de Broglie managed to escape in his nightshirt, but not his staff. The general staff and the war chest of 200,000 thalers fell into the Austrian hands. Meanwhile, the fifth column under FML Franz von Hohenems and the sixth column under FML Franz von Czungenberg had crossed the river. The French were driven from their positions.

Königsegg gathered his columns and intended to encircle Quistello. Marshal Broglie and King Charles Emmanuel III had meanwhile gathered parts of their scattered troops and intended to advance against Gaidella. Königsegg quickly countered the units still in formation, whereupon the king ordered a retreat and the evacuation of Quistello. While reconnoitring, Count Waldeck unexpectedly encountered French troops. They fired a volley that killed the count and several members of his staff. After about 15 hours the encounter was won by the Imperials.

== Sources ==
- Luehe, Hanns Eggert Willibald von der (1837). Militair-Conversations-Lexicon. Vol. 6. pp. 699 and further.
- Schels, Johann Baptist (1824). Die Feldzüge der Oestreicher in Ober-Italien in den Jahren 1733 bis 1735. pp. 180 and further.
- Bodart, Gaston (1908). Militär-historisches Kriegs-Lexikon (1618–1905). C. W. Stern. p. 181.
- Walser, Gabriel. Neue Appenzeller-Chronick. p. 116.
- Feldzüge des Prinzen Eugen von Savoyen. Vol. 19. 1891. pp. 367 and further.
