= Treaty of Turin (1733) =

1733 treaty between France and Savoy

- Signed: 26 September 1733
- Location: Turin, Kingdom of Sardinia
- Signatories: Louis XV of France; Charles Emmanuel III of Sardinia
- Parties: Kingdom of France; Kingdom of Sardinia

The Treaty of Turin, signed in Turin on 26 September 1733 was a secret agreement between Louis XV of France and Charles Emmanuel III of Sardinia. Charles Emmanuel was promised French military support for the conquest of the Duchy of Milan in exchange for allowing French troops to use his territory in the Duchy of Savoy in the attack on other Italian territories including the Grand Duchy of Tuscany and the Kingdom of the Two Sicilies. The treaty paved the way for French military activity on the Italian peninsula in the War of the Polish Succession.

== Bibliography ==
- Perkins, James Breck. France under Louis XV
