= List of intellectuals of the Enlightenment =

The Age of Enlightenment was an intellectual and philosophical movement taking place in Europe from the late 17th century to the early 19th century. The Enlightenment, which valued knowledge gained through rationalism and empiricism, was concerned with a range of social ideas and political ideals such as natural law, liberty, and progress, toleration and fraternity, constitutional government, and the formal separation of church and state.

This list of intellectuals, sorted alphabetically by surname, includes figures largely from Western Europe and British North America. Overwhelmingly these intellectuals were male, but the emergence of women philosophers who made contributions is notable.

Person	Dates	Nationality	Notes	
Thomas Abbt	1738–1766	German	Author of "Vom Tode für das Vaterland" (On dying for one's nation).	
Jean le Rond d'Alembert	1717–1783	French	Mathematician and physicist, one of the editors of the Encyclopédie.	
Francis Bacon	1561–1626	English	Philosopher who started the revolution in empirical thought that characterized much of the Enlightenment.	
Pierre Bayle	1647–1706	French	Author of the widely-circulated and influential work in French, not Latin, Dictionnaire historique et critique, and "Nouvelles de la république des lettres"; following Spinoza and others he was an advocate of tolerance between the different religious beliefs.	
James Beattie	1735–1803	Scottish	Poet, moralist, and philosopher.	
Cesare Beccaria	1738–1794	Italian	Criminal law reformer, best known for his treatise On Crimes and Punishments (1764).	
Balthasar Bekker	1634–1698	Dutch	Dutch Reformed theologian and a key figure in the early Enlightenment. In his book De Philosophia Cartesiana (1668) Bekker argued that theology and philosophy each had their separate terrains and that Nature can no more be explained from Scripture than can theological truth be deduced from Nature. Author of The World Bewitched in Dutch, not Latin (1692–93).	
George Berkeley	1685–1753	Irish	Philosopher and mathematician famous for developing the theory of subjective idealism.	
Justus Henning Boehmer	1674–1749	German	Ecclesiastical jurist, one of the first reformers of the church law and the civil law which was the basis for further reforms and maintained until the 20th century.	
Ruđer Josip Bošković (Roger Joseph Boscovich)	1711–1787	Ragusan (Serbian)	A physicist, astronomer, mathematician, philosopher, diplomat, poet, theologian, Jesuit priest, and a polymath from the Republic of Ragusa (today Dubrovnik, Croatia), who studied and lived in Italy and France where he also published many of his works. He produced a precursor of atomic theory and made many contributions to astronomy, including the first geometric procedure for determining the equator of a rotating planet from three observations of a surface feature and for computing the orbit of a planet from three observations of its position. In 1753 he also discovered the absence of atmosphere on the Moon.	
James Boswell	1740–1795	Scottish	Biographer of Samuel Johnson, helped established the norms for writing biography in general.	
G.L. Buffon	1707–1788	French	Biologist, author of L'Histoire Naturelle considered Natural Selection and the similarities between humans and apes.	
Edmund Burke	1729–1797	Anglo-Irish	Parliamentarian and political philosopher, best known for pragmatism, considered important to both Enlightenment and conservative thinking.	
Joseph Butler	1692–1752	English	Bishop, theologian, Christian apologist, and philosopher. He also played an important, though under appreciated, role in the development of eighteenth-century economic discourse.	
George Campbell	1719-1796	Scottish	A figure of the Scottish Enlightenment, known as a philosopher, minister, and professor of divinity. Campbell was primarily interested in rhetoric and faculty psychology.	
Dimitrie Cantemir	1673–1723	Moldavian (Romanian)	Philosopher, historian, composer, musicologist, linguist, ethnographer, and geographer.	
Émilie du Châtelet	1706–1749	French	Mathematician, physicist, and author. Translated Newton's Principia with commentary.	
Anders Chydenius	1729–1803	Finnish-Swedish	Priest and an ecclesiastical member of the Riksdag, contemporary known as the leading classical liberal of Nordic history.	
Francisco Javier Clavijero	1731–1787	Mexican	Historian, best known for his Antique History of Mexico.	
Étienne Bonnot de Condillac	1714–1780	French	Philosopher.	
Marquis de Condorcet	1743–1794	French	Philosopher, mathematician, and early political scientist who devised the concept of a Condorcet method.	
Anne Conway	1631-1679	English	English rationalist philosopher, influenced Gottfried Leibniz, considered England most important woman philosopher. Author of The Principles of the Most Ancient and Modern Philosophy, published in Latin 1690, in English 1692.	
Mihály Csokonai Vitéz	1773-1805	Hungarian	Hungarian poet, main person in the Hungarian literary revival of the Enlightenment.	
Ekaterina Dashkova	1743–1810	Russian	Director of the Imperial Academy of Arts and Sciences (known now as the Russian Academy of Sciences).	
Denis Diderot	1713–1784	French	Founder of the Encyclopédie, speculated on free will and attachment to material objects, art critic, contributed to the theory of literature.	
Leonhard Euler	1707–1783	Swiss	Mathematician, physicist, astronomer, geographer, logician and engineer.	
Benito Jerónimo Feijóo y Montenegro	1676–1764	Spanish	The most prominent promoter of the critical empiricist attitude at the dawn of the Spanish Enlightenment. See also the Spanish Martín Sarmiento (1695–1772)	
Adam Ferguson	1723-1816	Scottish	Philosopher and historian.	
Gaetano Filangieri	1753–1788	Italian	Philosopher and jurist.	
Bernard le Bovier de Fontenelle	1657–1757	French	Author.	
Denis Fonvizin	1744–1792	Russian	Writer and playwright.	
José Gaspar Rodríguez de Francia	1766–1840	Paraguayan	First president of Paraguay. Introduced radical political ideas to Paraguay.	
Benjamin Franklin	1706–1790	American	Statesman, scientist, political philosopher, author. As a philosopher known for his writings on nationality, economic matters, aphorisms published in Poor Richard's Almanack and polemics in favor of American Independence. Involved with writing the United States Declaration of Independence and the Constitution of 1787.	
Ferdinando Galiani	1728-1787	Italian	Economist.	
Luigi Galvani	1737–1798	Italian	Physician, physicist and philosopher who was a pioneer in the studies of Bioelectricity.	
Antonio Genovesi	1712–1769	Italian	Writer on philosophy and political economy.	
Edward Gibbon	1737–1794	English	Historian best known for his Decline and Fall of the Roman Empire.	
Johann Wolfgang Goethe	1749–1832	German	Closely identified with Enlightenment values, progressing from Sturm und Drang ("Storm and Stress"); leader in Weimar Classicism.	
Olympe de Gouges	1748–1793	French	Playwright and activist who championed feminist politics, author of Declaration of the Rights of Woman and the Female Citizen. She was beheaded during the French Revolution.	
Hugo Grotius	1583–1645	Dutch	Philosopher of law and jurist who laid the foundations for international law, based on natural law. Wrote De jure belli ac pacis.	
Alexander Hamilton	1755–1804	American	Economist, political theorist and politician. A major protagonist for the Constitution of the United States, and the single greatest contributor to The Federalist Papers, advocating for the constitution's ratification through detailed examinations of its construction, philosophical and moral basis, and intent.	
Joseph Haydn	1732–1809	Austrian	A leading composer of the era; revolutionized i.a. the symphonic form.	
Claude Adrien Helvétius	1715–1771	French	Philosopher and writer. Famous for De l'esprit (On Mind).	
Johann Gottfried Herder	1744–1803	German	Theologian and linguist. Proposed that language determines thought, introduced concepts of ethnic study and nationalism, influential on later Romantic thinkers. Early supporter of democracy and republican self-rule.	
Thomas Hobbes	1588–1679	English	Philosopher who wrote Leviathan, a key text in political philosophy. While Hobbes justifies absolute monarchy, this work is the first to posit that the temporal power of a monarch comes about, not because God has ordained that he be monarch, but because his subjects have freely yielded their own power and freedom to him – in other words, Hobbes replaces the divine right of kings with an early formulation of the social contract. Hobbes' work was condemned by reformers for its defense of absolutism, and by traditionalists for its claim that the power of government derives from the power of its subjects rather than the will of God.	
Baron d'Holbach	1723–1789	French	Author, Encyclopédist and Europe's first outspoken atheist. Roused much controversy over his criticism of religion as a whole in his work The System of Nature.	
Ludvig Holberg	1684–1754	Norwegian	Writer, essayist, historian and playwright.	
Henry Home, Lord Kames	1696–1782	Scottish	Lawyer and philosopher. Patron of Adam Smith and David Hume. See Scottish Enlightenment.	
Robert Hooke	1635–1703	English	Probably the leading experimenter of his age, Curator of Experiments for the Royal Society. Performed the work which quantified such concepts as Boyle's Law and the inverse-square nature of gravitation, father of the science of microscopy.	
Wilhelm von Humboldt	1767–1835	German	Linguist, diplomat, founder of the modern educational system, philosopher.	
David Hume	1711–1776	Scottish	Philosopher, historian and essayist. Best known for his empiricism and rational skepticism, advanced doctrines of naturalism and material causes. Influenced Kant and Adam Smith.	
Francis Hutcheson	1694–1746	Scottish	Philosopher.	
Christiaan Huygens	1629–1695	Dutch	Physicist and mathematician who made groundbreaking contributions in optics and mechanics and is responsible for the mathematization of physics. Author of Horologium Oscillatorium and Treatise on Light.	
Thomas Jefferson	1743–1826	American	Statesman, political philosopher, educator. As a philosopher best known for the United States Declaration of Independence (1776), especially "All men are created equal", and his support of democracy in theory and practice. A polymath, he promoted higher education as a way to uplift the entire nation .	
Gaspar Melchor de Jovellanos	1744–1811	Spanish	Main figure of the Spanish Enlightenment. Preeminent statesman.	
Immanuel Kant	1724–1804	German	Philosopher and physicist. Established critical philosophy on a systematic basis, proposed a material theory for the origin of the Solar System, wrote on ethics and morals. Prescribed a politics of Enlightenment in What is Enlightenment? (1784). Influenced by Hume and Rousseau. Important figure in German Idealism, and important to the work of Fichte and Hegel.	
Vasyl Karazin	1773–1842	Russian and Ukrainian	Enlightenment figure, intellectual, inventor, founder of The Ministry of National Education in Russian Empire and scientific publisher in Ukraine. Founder of Kharkiv University, which now bears his name. Also known for opposing to what he saw as colonial exploitation of Ukraine by the Russian Empire, even though he himself was ethnically Serbian.	
Adriaan Koerbagh	1633–1669	Dutch	A follower of Spinoza Koerbagh was among the most radical figures of the Age of Enlightenment, rejecting and reviling the religious authorities and state as unreliable institutions and exposing theologians' and lawyers' language as vague and opaque tools to blind the people in order to maintain their own power. He wrote Een Bloemhof in 1668 in Dutch rather than Latin, which brought him to the immediate attention of authorities, who suppressed his work. He was arrested, tried, and imprisoned, where he rapidly died. His imprisonment and death was a cautionary tale for radical philosophers, including Spinoza, who subsequently published only anonymously.	
Hugo Kołłątaj	1750–1812	Polish	Active in the Commission for National Education and the Society for Elementary Textbooks, and reformed the Kraków Academy, of which he was rector in 1783–86. Co-authored the Polish-Lithuanian Commonwealth's Constitution of May 3, 1791, and founded the Assembly of Friends of the Government Constitution to assist in the document's implementation.	
Adamantios Korais	1748–1833	Greek	Leading philosopher and scholar of the Neo-Hellenic Enlightenment who exerted enormous influence on the Greek language, culture and Greece's legal system.	
Ignacy Krasicki	1735–1801	Polish	Leading poet of the Polish Enlightenment.	
Joseph-Louis Lagrange	1736–1813	Italian-French	Major mathematician, famous for his contributions to analysis, number theory, and mechanics.	
Antoine Lavoisier	1743–1794	French	Founder of modern chemistry; executed in the French Revolution for his politics	
Antonie van Leeuwenhoek	1632–1723	Dutch	The father of microbiology and known for his pioneering work in microscopy and for his contributions toward the establishment of microbiology as a scientific discipline. Van Leeuwenhoek was the first to discover living cells, bacteria, spermatozoa and red blood cells.	
Gottfried Leibniz	1646–1716	German	Polymath-philosopher, mathematician, diplomat, jurist, historian; rival of Newton.	
Giacomo Leopardi	1798–1837	Italian	Poet, essayist, philosopher, and philologist.	
Gotthold Ephraim Lessing	1729–1781	German	Dramatist, critic, political philosopher. Created theatre in the German language. Friend of Moses Mendelssohn, whose work he promoted.	
Georg Christoph Lichtenberg	1742–1799	German	Physicist, satirist, and aphorist.	
Carl von Linné (Carl Linnaeus)	1707–1778	Swedish	Botanist, physician, and zoologist, who laid the foundations for the modern scheme of binomial nomenclature. Known as the father of modern taxonomy.	
John Locke	1632–1704	English	Philosopher. Important empiricist who expanded and extended the work of Francis Bacon and Thomas Hobbes. Seminal thinker in the realm of the relationship between the state and the individual, the contractual basis of the state and the rule of law. Argued for personal liberty emphasizing the rights of property.	
Mikhail Lomonosov	1711–1765	Russian	Polymath, scientist and writer, who made important contributions to literature, education, and science.	
Gabriel Bonnot de Mably	1709-1785	French	Philosopher and historian.	
James Madison	1751–1836	American	Statesman and political philosopher. Played a key role in the writing of the United States Constitution and providing a theoretical justification for it in his contributions to The Federalist Papers; author of the American Bill of Rights.	
Sylvain Maréchal	1750–1803	French	Essayist, poet, and philosopher.	
George Mason	1725–1792	American	Statesman, authored the Virginia Declaration of Rights; along with Madison called the "Father of the United States Bill of Rights".	
Moses Mendelssohn	1729–1786	Jewish German	Philosopher of Jewish Enlightenment in Prussia (Haskalah), honoured by his friend Lessing in his drama as Nathan the Wise. Mendelssohn took from Spinoza's Theological-Political Treatise (1670) that Judaism is not a revealed religion but a belief based on law, and that religious toleration and liberty of conscience are essential goals.	
Jean Meslier	1664–1729	French	Roman Catholic priest, philosopher and first atheist writer since ancient times. Author of Testament, a book length essay, which supplied arguments and rhetoric used by other enlightenment authors such as Denis Diderot, Baron d'Holbach and Voltaire.	
La Mettrie	1709–1751	French	Physician and early French materialist philosopher. Best known as author of L'homme machine (Man a Machine).	
John Millar	1735–1801	Scottish	Philosopher and historian.	
Teodor Janković-Mirijevski	1741–1814	Serbian and Russian	Educational reformer, academic, scholar and pedagogical writer	
James Burnett, Lord Monboddo	1714–1799	Scottish	Philosopher, jurist, pre-evolutionary thinker and contributor to linguistic evolution. See Scottish Enlightenment	
Josef Vratislav Monse	1733–1793	Czech	Professor of Law at University of Olomouc, leading figure of Enlightenment in the Habsburg monarchy	
Montesquieu	1689–1755	French	Political thinker. Famous for his articulation of the theory of separation of powers, taken for granted in modern discussions of government and implemented in many constitutions all over the world. Political scientist, Donald Lutz, found that Montesquieu was the most frequently quoted authority on government in colonial America.	
Leandro Fernández de Moratín	1760–1828	Spanish	Dramatist and translator, support of republicanism and free thinking. Transitional figure to Romanticism.	
Henry More	1614-1687	English	Philosopher and theologian of the Cambridge Platonist school. Teacher and correspondent of Anne Conway; author of numerous works, including the Divine Dialogues (1688) and An Antidote against Atheism, or an Appeal to the Natural Faculties of the Minde of Man, whether there be not a God, 1653	Henry More
Wolfgang Amadeus Mozart	1756–1791	Austrian	A leading composer of the era. Influenced by Haydn, Mozart was a child prodigy born in Salzburg. He was quite popular throughout Europe in his lifetime. He died at the age of 35.	
José Celestino Mutis	1755–1808	Spanish	Botanist; lead the first botanic expeditions to South America, and built a major collection of plants.	
Isaac Newton	1642–1727	English	Lucasian professor of mathematics, Cambridge University; author of 'Philosophiae Naturalis Principia Mathematica' and 'Opticks'.	
Nikolay Novikov	1744–1818	Russian	Philanthropist and journalist who sought to raise the culture of Russian readers and publicly argued with the Empress. See Russian Enlightenment.	
Dositej Obradović	1739–1811	Serbian	Writer, linguist, educator, influential proponent of Serbian cultural nationalism, and founder of The Ministry of National Education in Karađorđe's Serbia, and founder of the University of Belgrade.	
Zaharije Orfelin	1726–1785	Serbian	Polymath-poet, writer, historian, translator, engraver, editor, publisher, etc.	
Francesco Mario Pagano	1748–1799	Italian	Jurist and philosopher, one of the pioneers of modern criminal law.	
Thomas Paine	1737–1809	English/American	Pamphleteer, most famous for Common Sense (1776), calling for American independence as the most rational solution.	
Marquis of Pombal	1699–1782	Portuguese	Statesman notable for his swift and competent leadership in the aftermath of the 1755 Lisbon earthquake. He also implemented sweeping economic policies to regulate commercial activity and standardize quality throughout the country.	
Stanisław August Poniatowski	1732–1798	Polish	Last king of independent Poland, a leading light of the Enlightenment in the Polish-Lithuanian Commonwealth, and co-author of one of the world's first modern constitutions, the Constitution of May 3, 1791.	
Richard Price	1723–1791	Welsh	Philosopher, preacher, and mathematician.	
Joseph Priestley	1733–1804	English	Philosopher, theologian, and chemist.	
François Quesnay	1694–1774	French	Economist of the Physiocratic school.	
Alexander Radishchev	1749–1802	Russian	Writer and philosopher. Brought the tradition of radicalism in Russian literature to prominence.	
Jovan Rajić	1726–1801	Serbian	Writer, historian, traveller, and pedagogue, considered to be one of the greatest Serbian academics of the 18th century.	
Guillaume Thomas François Raynal	1713–1796	French	Historian and abolitionist.	
Thomas Reid	1710–1796	Scottish	Philosopher who developed Common Sense Realism.	
Jean-Jacques Rousseau	1712–1778	Swiss	Political philosopher, educational reformer, composer; Encyclopédist who influenced many Enlightenment figures but did not himself believe in the primacy of reason and was a forerunner of Romanticism.	
Giovanni Salvemini	1708-1791	Italian	Mathematician and astronomer.	
Friedrich Schiller	1759–1805	German	Philosopher, poet, and playwright.	
Adam Smith	1723–1790	Scottish	Economist and philosopher. Wrote The Wealth of Nations, in which he argued that wealth was not money in itself, but wealth was derived from the added value in manufactured items produced by both invested capital and labour. Sometimes considered to be the founding father of the laissez-faire economic theory, but in fact argues for some degree of government control in order to maintain equity. Just prior to this he wrote Theory of Moral Sentiments, explaining how it is humans function and interact through what he calls sympathy, setting up important context for The Wealth of Nations.	
Jan Śniadecki	1756–1830	Polish	Mathematician, philosopher, and astronomer.	
Jędrzej Śniadecki	1768–1838	Polish	Writer, physician, chemist, and biologist.	
Baruch Spinoza	1632–1677	Dutch	Philosopher and author of the Ethics, in which he denied the transcendence of God and compared the existence of God to nature ('deus sive natura').	
Alexander Sumarokov	1717–1777	Russian	Poet and playwright who created classical theatre in Russia.	
Emanuel Swedenborg	1688–1772	Swedish	Natural philosopher and theologian whose search for the operation of the soul in the body led him to construct a detailed metaphysical model for spiritual-natural causation.	
Matthew Tindal	1657–1733	English	Deist. His works, highly influential at the dawn of the Enlightenment, caused great controversy and challenged the Christian consensus of his time.	
John Toland	1670–1722	Irish	Philosopher and satirist.	
Josiah Tucker	1713–1799	Welsh	Welsh churchman, known as an economist and political writer. He was concerned in his works with free trade, Jewish emancipation and American independence. He became Dean of Gloucester in 1758.	
Pietro Verri	1728-1797	Italian	Philosopher, economist, and historian.	
Giambattista Vico	1668–1744	Italian	Political philosopher, rhetorician, historian, and jurist.	
Voltaire (François-Marie Arouet)	1694–1778	French	Highly influential writer, historian and philosopher. He promoted Newtonianism and denounced organized religion as pernicious.	
Adam Weishaupt	1748–1830	German	Founded the Order of the Illuminati.	
Christoph Martin Wieland	1733–1813	German	Philosopher and poet.	
Christian Wolff	1679–1754	German	Philosopher and mathematician.	
Mary Wollstonecraft	1759–1797	English	Writer, and pioneer feminist.	

== See also ==
- Age of Enlightenment
