= Italian Enlightenment =

Italian cultural and philosophical movement

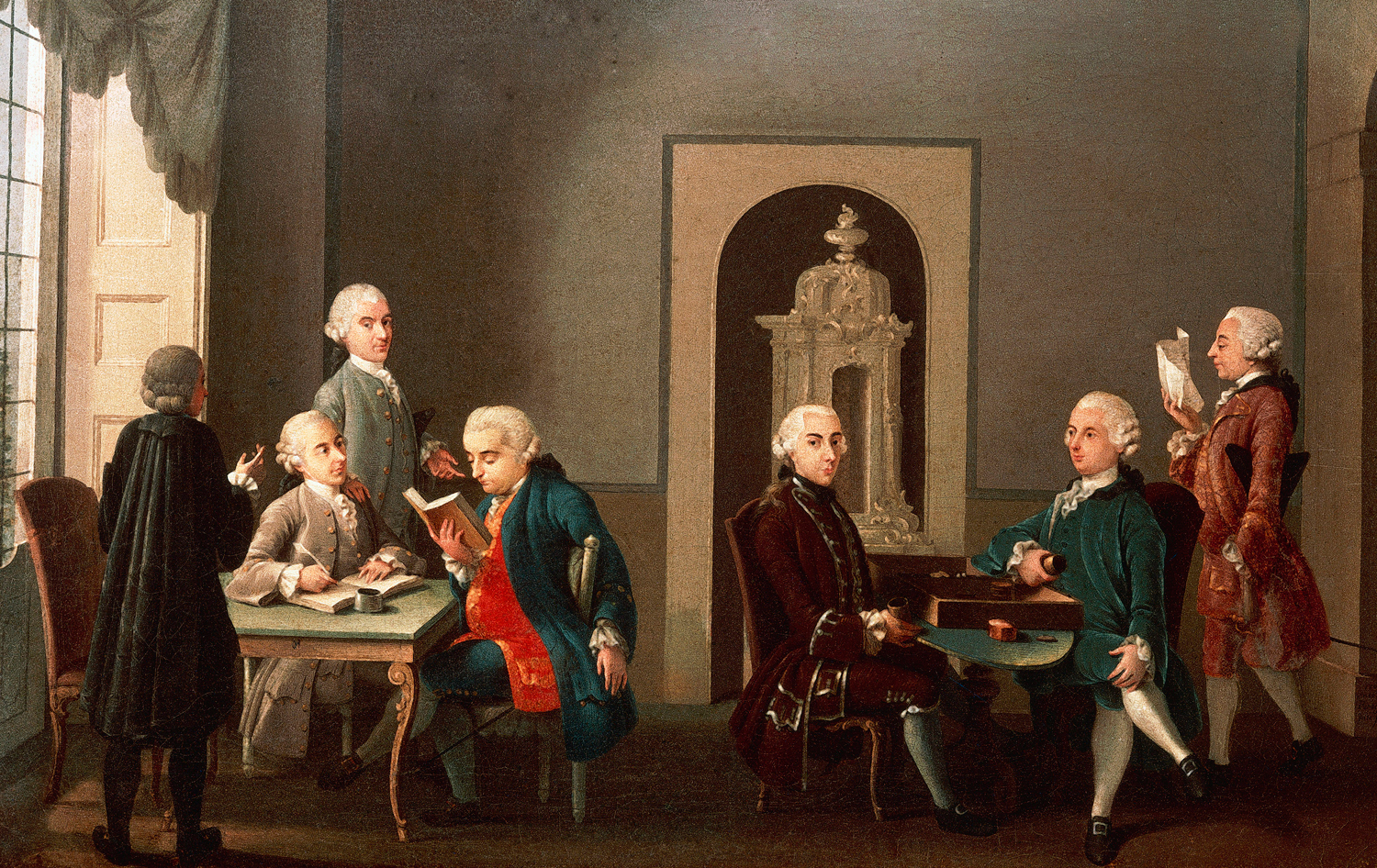
The members of the Milanese Accademia dei Pugni. From left to right: Alfonso Longo (back), Alessandro Verri, Giambattista Biffi, Cesare Beccaria, Luigi Lambertenghi, Pietro Verri and Giuseppe Visconti di Saliceto.

The Italian Enlightenment (Italian: l'Illuminismo italiano) refers to the intellectual and cultural movement that flourished in the region of modern-day Italy during the second half of the 18th century as part of the broader Enlightenment (historically known in Italian as l'Illuminismo). The movement was characterized by the discussion of the epistemological, ethical, and political issues of the time.

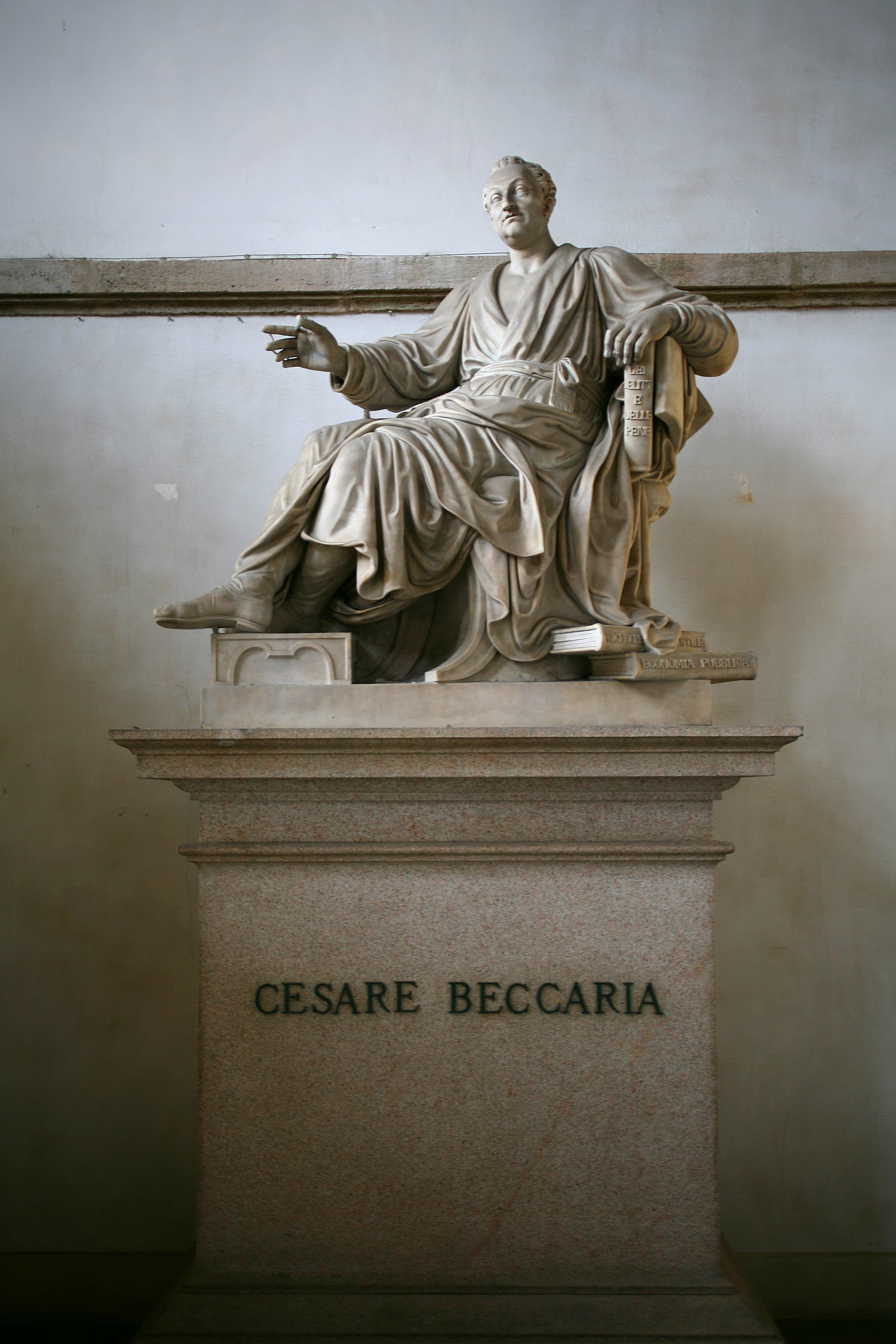
Statue of Cesare Beccaria, widely considered one of the greatest thinkers of the Age of Enlightenment.

== History ==
In Italy there was no shortage of local thinkers that can be defined as pre-Enlightenment (as well as scientific experiences similar to those that had generated Empiricism), such as the Neapolitan Giambattista Vico, who, although deviating much, in many fields, from the future themes of the eighteenth century, was the model for many Enlightenment thinkers, especially those of his city.

In Italy the main centers of diffusion of the Enlightenment were Naples and Milan: in both cities the intellectuals took public office and collaborated with the Bourbon and Habsburg administrations. In Naples, Antonio Genovesi, Ferdinando Galiani and Gaetano Filangieri were active under the tolerant Bourbon king of Naples, Charles VII. However, the Neapolitan Enlightenment, like Vico's philosophy, remained almost always in the theoretical field. Only later, many Enlighteners animated the unfortunate experience of the Parthenopean Republic.

In Milan, however, the movement strove to find concrete solutions to problems. The center of discussions was the magazine Il Caffè (1762–1764), founded by brothers Pietro and Alessandro Verri (famous philosophers and writers, as well as their brother Giovanni), who also gave life to the Accademia dei Pugni, founded in 1761.

== Neapolitan Enlightenment ==
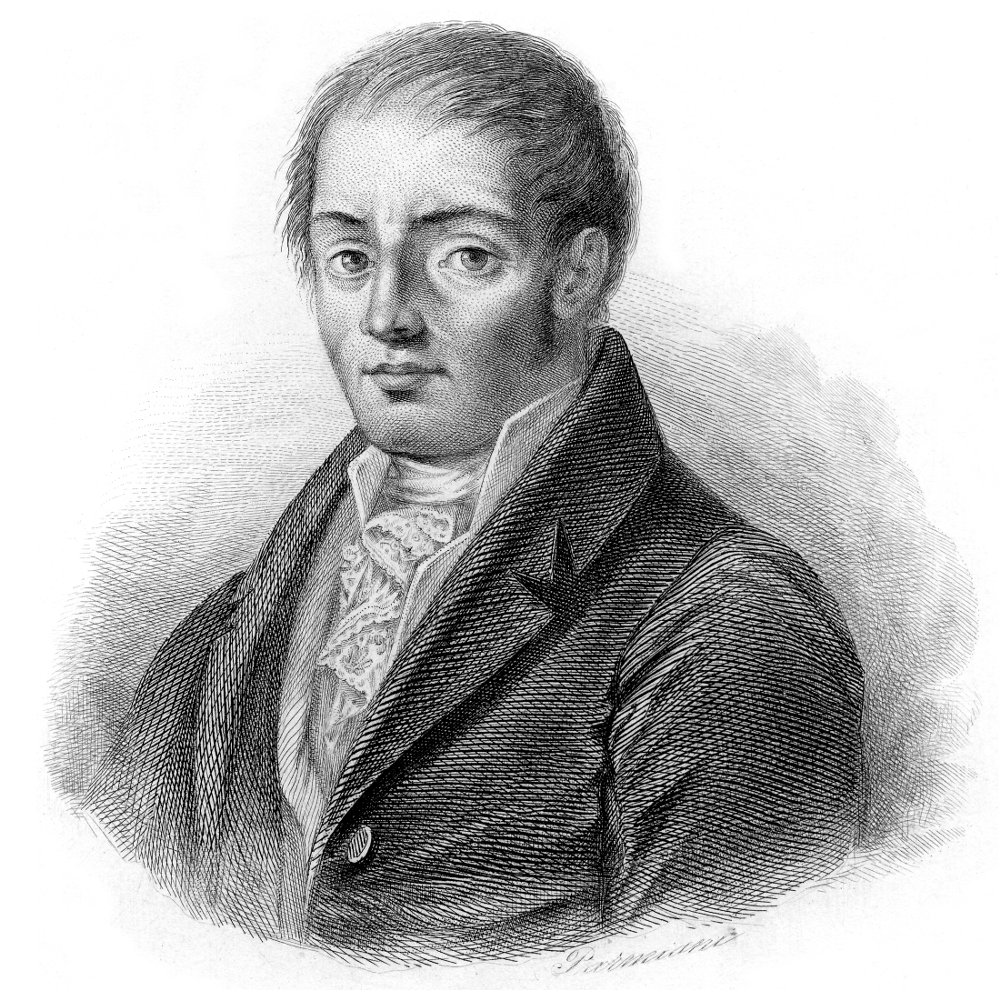
Mario Pagano

The Italian Enlightenment was particularly active in Naples, in this period capital of the homonymous Kingdom of Naples. The city of Naples, together with the French capital Paris, best carried out the "century of enlightenment"; in fact, it did not simply absorb this current, on the contrary, it generated it to a great extent, giving life to new architectural forms, updated philosophical thoughts and laying the foundations of modern economy and law. In fact, Naples had already been the vital center of the naturalistic philosophy of the Renaissance, and now it returned to give a new impetus to the thought of several exponents, such as Mario Pagano, one of the most important Italian jurists and politicians of the revolutionary era, who largely drew on the work of Giambattista Vico, but eliminating the Christian aspects of his philosophy.

Significant were the constructions of important public buildings, among all the Real Albergo dei Poveri (also known as Palazzo Fuga from the name of the architect who designed and built it in 1751 on commission of Charles VII), which is among the most remarkable eighteenth-century buildings, typically Enlightenment: 354 meters long and a useful surface of 103,000 sq. m. Politically, the anti-curial and anti-feudal stances of the Neapolitan government became models of inspiration that were also successful abroad.

To be remembered also the birth of the economic school of Antonio Genovesi, who brought several innovations in the field of national economy and not only, followed also in Apulia by the man of letters Ferrante de Gemmis Maddalena, who founded an Enlightenment Academy, and by the economist Giuseppe Palmieri, director of the Supreme Council of Finance of the Kingdom of Naples at the end of the 18th century. Other prominent names that laid the foundations of modern political economy, economic and monetary disciplines are: Ferdinando Galiani and Gaetano Filangeri. The latter in particular, with his science of legislation, was to inspire the architects of the French Revolution.

The last Neapolitan illuminists, such as Mario Pagano, Ignazio Ciaia and Domenico Cirillo, joined the Neapolitan Republic and were executed on 29 October 1799 after the restoration of Bourbon power. Others, such as Canon Onofrio Tataranni, had their lives saved because they were protected by the church itself.

== Lombard Enlightenment ==
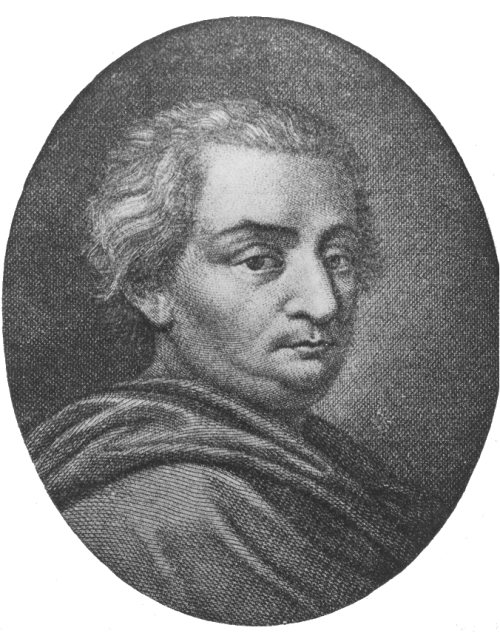
Cesare Beccaria

The enlightenment in Lombardy took its first steps at the Accademia dei Trasformati, founded in 1743. In the academy, characterized by a predominantly aristocratic component, the new Enlightenment theories were debated, trying, however, to reconcile them with classical traditions.

Among the members of the Accademia dei Trasformati there was also Pietro Verri, who, however, soon broke away from it to create, together with his brother Alessandro, the Accademia dei Pugni in 1761, whose name was inspired by the animosity with which they discussed. Connected to the Accademia dei Pugni was the magazine Il Caffè, a cultural sheet close to the Enlightenment theories inspired by the first modern newspapers such as The Spectator.

In addition to the Verri brothers, among the students of the Accademia dei Pugni there was another of the most famous Italian Enlightenment figures: Cesare Beccaria. Beccaria's is the most famous work of the Italian Enlightenment: the juridical treatise Dei delitti e delle pene published in 1763, in which, referring to the theories of the philosophes and to some recent legislations such as that of Empress Elizabeth of Russia, he proposed with rigorous logic the abolition of torture and the death penalty. The work was also admired by Voltaire and the Encyclopédistes and had much influence on sovereigns such as Catherine II of Russia, Maria Theresa of Austria, but especially on the Grand Duchy of Tuscany, where Peter Leopold in 1786 abolished torture and the death penalty, followed by his brother Joseph II of Austria.

The Enlightenment brought new stimuli also to art and poetry: an important poet with Enlightenment ideas was Giuseppe Parini, another great exponent of the Lombard Enlightenment, who satirized the nobility and its privileges in the poem Il Giorno (The Day), while in the theater encouraged playwrights and dramatists towards new ideas: this is the case of Vittorio Alfieri and Carlo Goldoni.

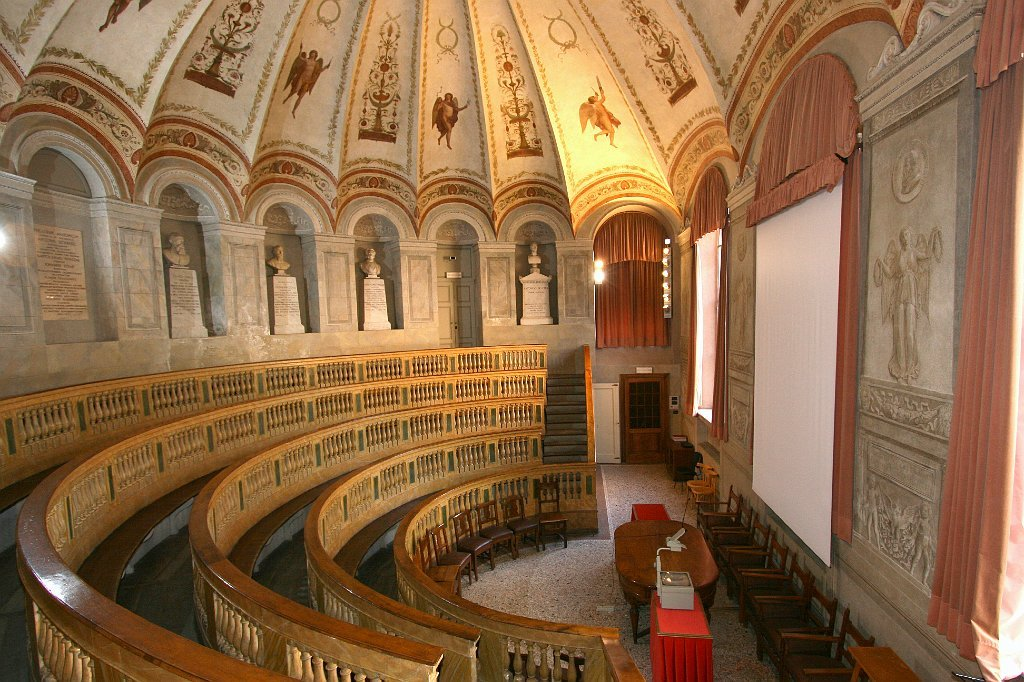
Università di Pavia, Aula Scarpa, Leopoldo Pollack, 1785- 1786.

Of the enlightened Milanese school are also remembered Paolo Frisi, Ruggero Boscovich, Alfonso Longo and Gian Rinaldo Carli, all contributors to Il Caffè. In the Duchy of Milan the Empress Maria Theresa and her son Giuseppe II gave great impulse to the spread of the new Enlightenment theories and in particular through the rebirth of the University of Pavia, in fact the sovereigns, inspired by the principles of enlightened absolutism, made significant administrative reforms to the university, which became one of the best in Europe, they provided it with new buildings and laboratories and called to teach professors of continental fame, such as Alessandro Volta, Antonio Scarpa, Lazzaro Spallanzani and Lorenzo Mascheroni. The new ideas had repercussions not only in teaching, but also in rights, so much so that in 1777 Maria Pellegrina Amoretti graduated from Pavia, the first woman to receive a degree in law from an Italian university.

== List of Italian enlighteners ==
- Vittorio Alfieri
- Francesco Algarotti
- Cosimo Amidei
- Sallustio Bandini
- Giuseppa Eleonora Barbapiccola
- Giuseppe Baretti
- Cesare Beccaria
- Giambattista Vico
- Ludovico Antonio Muratori
- Gian Rinaldo Carli
- Melchiorre Cesarotti
- Ferrante de Gemmis
- Carlo Denina
- Gaetano Filangieri
- Antonio Genovesi
- Ferdinando Galiani
- Rosario Bonventre
- Pietro Giannone
- Carlo Goldoni
- Gaspare Gozzi
- Giuseppe Parini
- Pompeo Neri
- Mario Pagano
- Nicola Fiorentino
- Giuseppe Palmieri
- Alberto Radicati
- Onofrio Tataranni
- Alessandro Verri
- Pietro Verri
- Antonio Zanon
- Francesco Saverio Salfi
- Giuseppe Todaro
- Alessandro Volta
- Lazzaro Spallanzani
- Ruggero Giuseppe Boscovich
- Domenico Cirillo
- Giuseppe Maria Galanti
- Francesco Longano
- Saverio Mattei
