= Il Caffè =

Italian magazine (1764–1766)

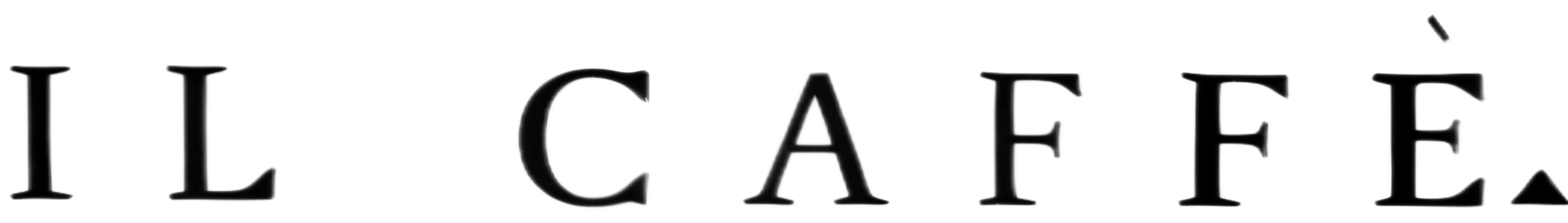

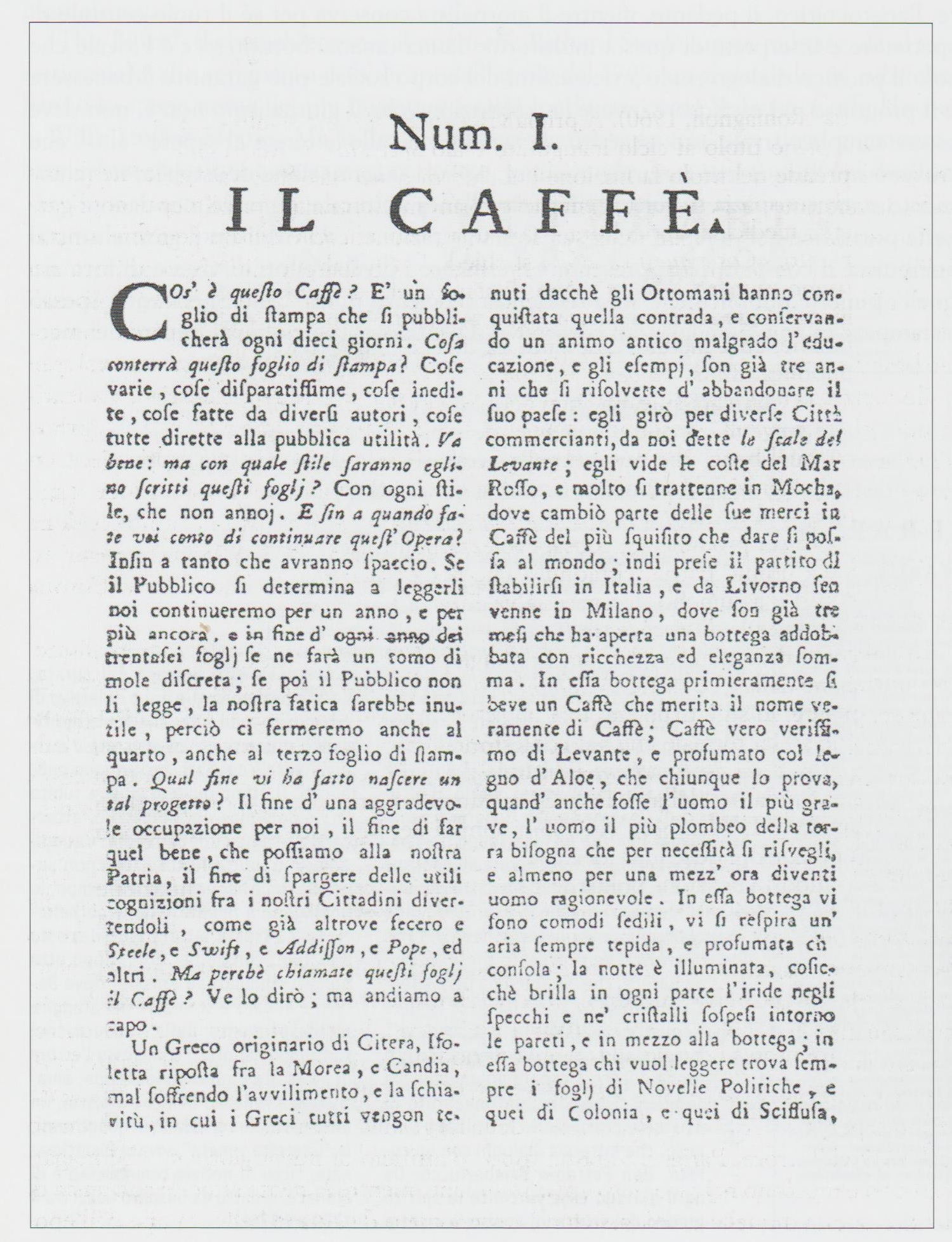
- First issue of Il Caffè (1764)
- Publisher: Giammaria Rizzardi
- Founder: Pietro Verri; Alessandro Verri
- Founded: 1764
- First issue: June 1764
- Final issue: May 1766
- Based in: Milan
- Language: Italian
- ISSN: 1125-0178

Il Caffè (Italian, 'The Coffeehouse') was magazine headquartered in Milan between 1764 and 1766. It was the most significant publication of the Enlightenment period in the country. A notable contributor to Il Caffè was the philosopher and economist Cesare Beccaria, author of the influential treatise Dei delitti e delle pene (1764; On Crimes and Punishments).

== History and profile ==
Il Caffè was first published in June 1764. To evade Austrian censorship, the magazine was printed in Brescia (then belonging to the Republic of Venice). The original run consisted of 74 numbers. These were collected into two volumes. Founded by the brothers Pietro and Alessandro Verri, Il Caffè came out every ten days from June 1764 to May 1766. It was influenced by the thought of the French philosophes and exerted a notable influence on contemporary Italian culture and political life. Consciously evoking Addison's and Steele's Spectator, the journal shared with the English paper a use of irony as a weapon against contemporary morals and customs, but was imbued with a more immediate political purpose. The articles dealt with a wide range of subjects, from natural history to medicine, philosophy, music, ethics, law, and literature, all expounding the same theme: the need for social, economic, and political reform.

Articles took the form of reported discussions between the cultured clients of Demetrio, the Greek owner of a Milanese coffeehouse. The aim was to challenge the reader. On social and economic matters, the journal reflected the arguments and proposals for reform which emerged from the debates of the members of the Accademia dei Pugni, the name given to the group of intellectuals who met under the inspiration of Pietro Verri. In other areas it contained contributions by Beccaria on aesthetics, Pietro Verri's defence of Goldoni's theatre against the attacks of Baretti, Gian Rinaldo Carli's essay on the cultural unity of Italians, and the anti-purist arguments of the Verri brothers for an Italian language closer to common usage.

Among its other contributors were the Carlo Sebastiano Franci and Alfonso Longo, the mathematician Paolo Frisi, the polymath Roger Joseph Boscovich and the optician François de Baillou. Il Caffè was lambasted by Baretti, but it gained favor all over Europe. The magazine was folded in May 1766 due to disputes between Verri and Beccaria.
