= Carlo Verri =

Italian politician (1743–1823)

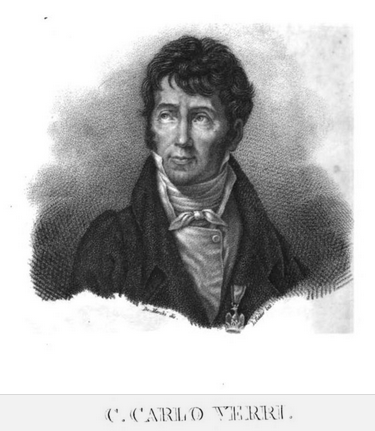
Carlo Verri

Carlo Verri (1743–1823) was an Italian politician.

Born in Milan, he was the brother of literates Alessandro and Pietro Verri. During the Napoleonic suzerainty in Italy, he was deputy and prefect in the Italian Republic and the Kingdom of Italy. In the town of Biassono there is now a museum dedicated to him.

He died at Verona.
