= Morellet =

Morellet is a surname. Notable people with the surname include:

- André Morellet (1727–1819), French economist writer and contributor to the Encyclopédie ou Dictionnaire raisonné des sciences
- François Morellet (1926–2016), French contemporary painter, sculptor, and light artist

== See also ==
- 11950 Morellet, an outer main-belt asteroid
