= Alessandro Verri =

Italian author

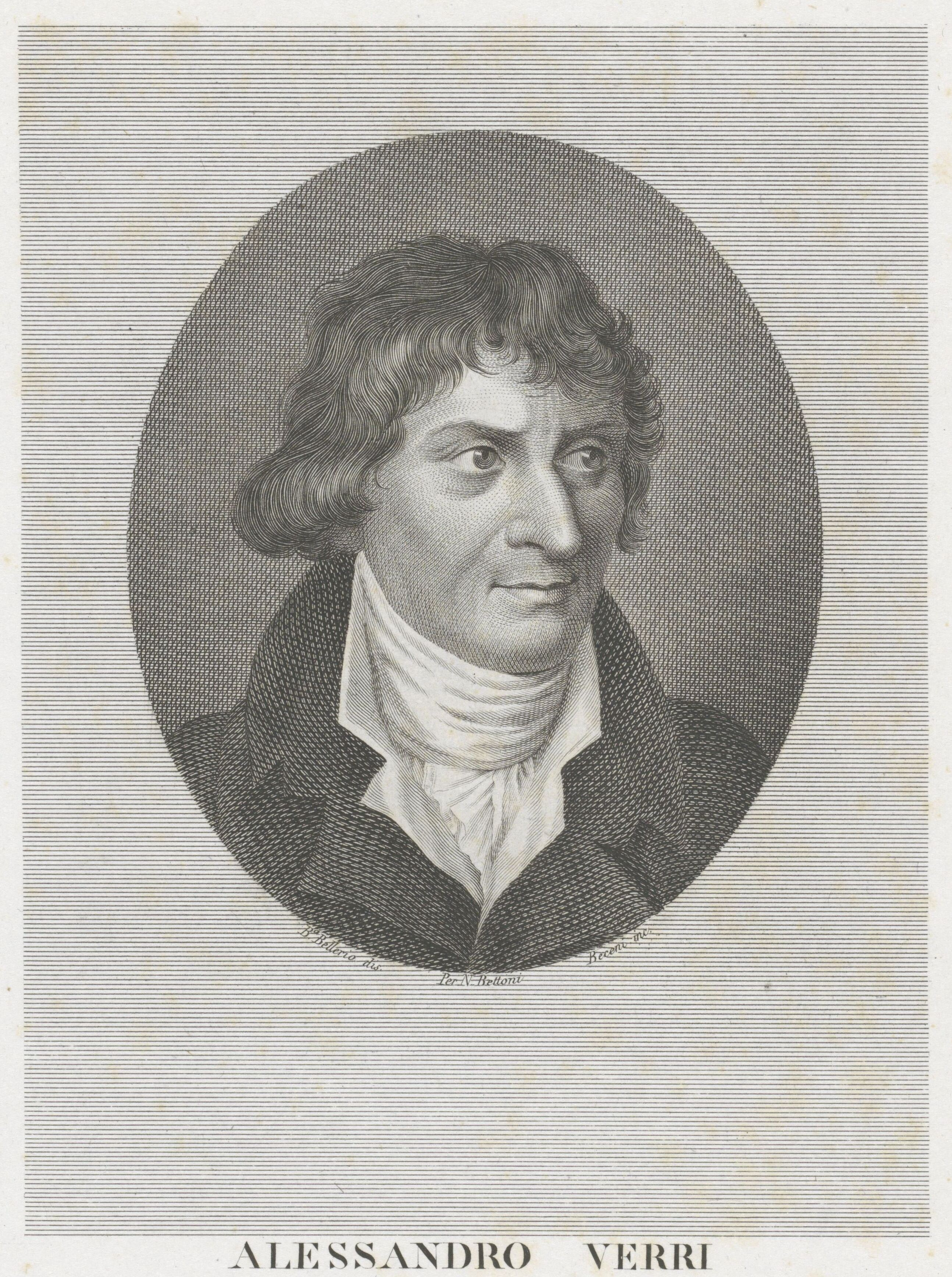
- Born: 9 November 1741; Milan, Duchy of Milan
- Died: 23 September 1816 (aged 74); Rome, Papal States
- Parent(s): Gabriele Verri, Barbara Dati della Somaglia

Academic background
- Influences: Montesquieu; Voltaire; Hume; Muratori; Galileo; Vico; Beccaria

Academic work
- Era: Age of Enlightenment
- School or tradition: Italian Enlightenment; Preromanticism
- Notable works: Le notti romane (Roman Nights, 1792–1804)

Signature
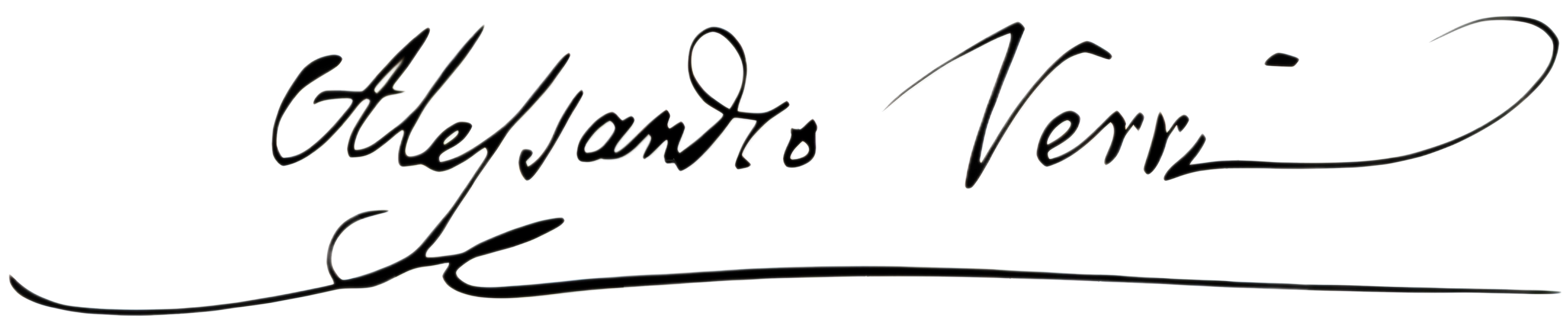

Alessandro Verri (9 November 1741 – 23 September 1816) was an Italian historian, philosopher and writer. Together with his brother Pietro and Cesare Beccaria he was among the leading figures of the Lombard Enlightenment.

== Background ==
=== Early life ===
Alessandro Verri was born in Milan into an aristocratic family. His father, Gabriele Verri, was a magistrate and future President of the Senate of Milan; his brothers were the philosopher Pietro Verri, the politician Carlo and Giovanni, supposed to be the natural father of the noted Italian novelist and poet Alessandro Manzoni. Alessandro was distinguished by a refined aesthetic and philosophical sensibility far removed from the optimistic and progressive beliefs of the age.

He studied in the Somascan college in Merate and in the Barnabite college in San Alessandro in Milan. After taking his degree in jurisprudence at the University of Pavia in 1760, Verri was accepted (at a very young age) to the college of noble legal professionals in Milan, and held the post of “protector of jailed prisoners.” Together with his older brother Pietro, he founded the Accademia dei Pugni, and opened up to the culture of the Enlightenment. In his youth he shared the historical, legislative, and juridical interests of the circle of Cesare Beccaria.

Between 1763 and 1766 he wrote, but did not publish, a Saggio di morale cristiana (Essay in Christian Morality) and an ample Saggio sulla storia d'Italia dalla fondazione di Roma fino alla metà del nostro secolo (Essay on the History of Italy from the Foundation of Rome to the Middle of Our Century; commonly given the short title Storia d'Italia, 2001). The latter work, written for a general readership, echoed Verri's reading of Voltaire and Montesquieu, but also bears the stamp of a meticulous erudition inspired by Ludovico Antonio Muratori, and reflects a keen interest in the “primitive” and the “barbaric” derived from the Scienza nuova of Giambattista Vico.

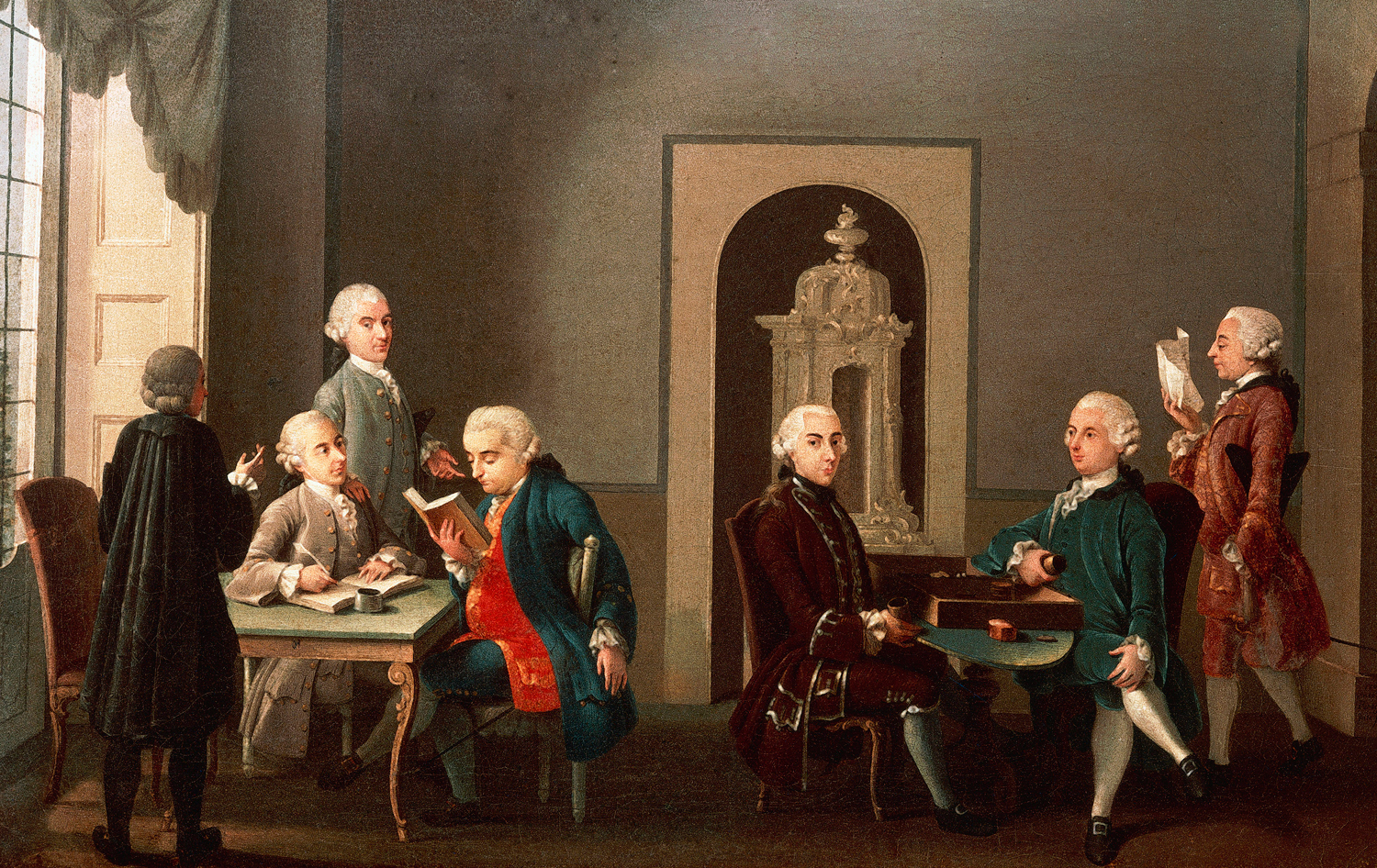
The members of the Milanese Accademia dei Pugni. From left to right: Alfonso Longo (back), Alessandro Verri, Giambattista Biffi, Cesare Beccaria, Luigi Lambertenghi, Pietro Verri and Giuseppe Visconti di Saliceto.

Verri was the most lively contributor to the magazine Il Caffè, and the one most endowed with journalistic talent. In some of his articles he aimed to rejuvenate the culture by proposing a more modern idea of the role of the intellectual, of literary prose, and of the language itself. In others, he developed a radical critique of Roman law and the juridical systems of his time, probing the limits of natural law theory, against which he set a utilitarian philosophy built around the ideals of moderation and a virtuous life. In accordance with Enlightenment thought, he set forth an ideal of man as sensitive, free, and actively working to transform reality. Some of his writings, however, reflect an unresolved tension between enthusiasm and reason, between passion and “cold logic,” along with a suspicion that the violent motions of the soul might act to destabilize the inner harmony of the person.

=== Paris and London ===
In 1766–1767 Alessandro accompanied Beccaria on his journey to Paris and London. His sojourn in the two capitals had the effect of heightening his uncertainties. The philosophe circles with whom he came in contact repelled him with their tone of fanaticism and with the prevailing attitude of derision toward religion: Verri was present, astonished and appalled, at a private reading of the Système de la Nature at d'Holbach's house. London, in contrast, seemed to him a symbol of a cohesive and stable civil society, and of a tranquil and reasonable way of life—an impression that abetted his choice of David Hume, with his detached skepticism, as the champion of a “gentle philosophy.”

=== Rome ===
Rather than return to Milan, Alessandro Verri settled in Rome for the rest of his life, drawn by his relationship with the marquise Margherita Boccapadule Gentili, and by a desire to live independently of his family. By 1770 he had come to a position that differed from that of his own years at Il Caffè, and from that of his brother Pietro, with whom he engaged in an epistolary dialogue that constitutes the most important exchange of letters in eighteenth-century Italy. Under the influence of Rome, he took up classical studies again, translated Shakespeare's Hamlet and Othello, became more interested in art and theater, and gave up his ironic style, for one founded on a neoclassical ideal of elegance and clarity exemplified by Greek models.

Aside from minor writings, his Roman years yielded two tragedies (Pantea and La congiura di Milano), published under the title Tentativi drammatici (Attempts at Drama, Leghorn, 1779) and three novels: Le avventure di Saffo, poetessa di Mitilene (The Adventures of Sappho, Poetess of Mytilene, 1780); Le notti romane (Roman Nights, 1792–1804), which enjoyed enormous success in Italy and abroad; and La vita di Erostrato (The Life of Erostratus, 1815). Verri's novels show a refined sense of formal and stylistic decorum, and a Winckelmannian perspective, in which architectural ruins and chiaroscuro have a symbolic function, and an aesthetics of the sublime reinterprets the modern world in the light of that of antiquity.

In Le vicende memorabili dal 1789 al 1801 (The Memorable Events of 1789–1801, written in the first decade of the nineteenth century and published posthumously at Milan, 1858), Alessandro Verri arrived at a counterrevolutionary and reactionary position. He rejected modern culture and the Enlightenment idea of the continuous progress of knowledge, and attacked the philosophes as the direct instigators of the wave of revolution that had overturned all order, all values, and all certainty. Verri died in Rome in 1816. An accomplished classicist, Verri published Italian translations of the Iliad (1799) and of the Hellenistic romance Daphnis and Chloe (1812). He also published a critical edition of the works of Annibale Caro.

== Works ==
- Le avventure di Saffo poetessa di Mitilene. Padua: Giovanni Manfrè. 1780.
- Tentativi drammatici. Leghorn: Falorni. 1779.
- Le notti romane al sepolcro degli Scipioni, Rome, 1792–1804.
- La vita di Erostrato. Milan: nella stamperia de Romanis. 1815.
- Renzo Negri, ed. (1967). Le Notti Romane. Bari: Laterza. Archived from the original on 26 January 2021.
- F. Novati; A. Giulini; E. Greppi; G. Seregni, eds. (1910–1942). Carteggio di Pietro e di Alessandro Verri. 12 vols. Milan: L. F. Cogliati; Milesi & figli; Giuffrè.
- G. Gasparri, ed. (1980). Viaggio a Parigi e Londra (1766–1767) – Carteggio di Pietro ed Alessandro Verri. 12 vols. Milan: Adelphi.
- S. Rosini, ed. (2008). Carteggio di Pietro e Alessandro Verri. 19 maggio 1792 – 8 luglio 1797. Rome: Edizioni di Storia e Letteratura. ISBN 9788863720945.

== Sources ==
- Musitelli, Pierre (2020). "VERRI, Alessandro". Dizionario Biografico degli Italiani (in Italian). Vol. 99: Verrazzano–Vittorio Amedeo. Rome: Istituto dell'Enciclopedia Italiana. ISBN 978-88-12-00032-6.
- Wheelock, James T. S. (1969). "Verri's Notti romane: A New Edition and Some Old Translations". Italica. 46 (1): 58–68. doi:10.2307/478021. JSTOR 478021.
- Bufalini, Robert (1969). "Alessandro Verri and the End of the Philosophical Journey of the European Enlightenment". Modern Language Notes. 130 (1): 86–104. JSTOR 24463833.
