= André Morellet =

French academic (1728–1820)

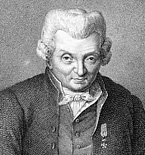
Engraving of André Morellet

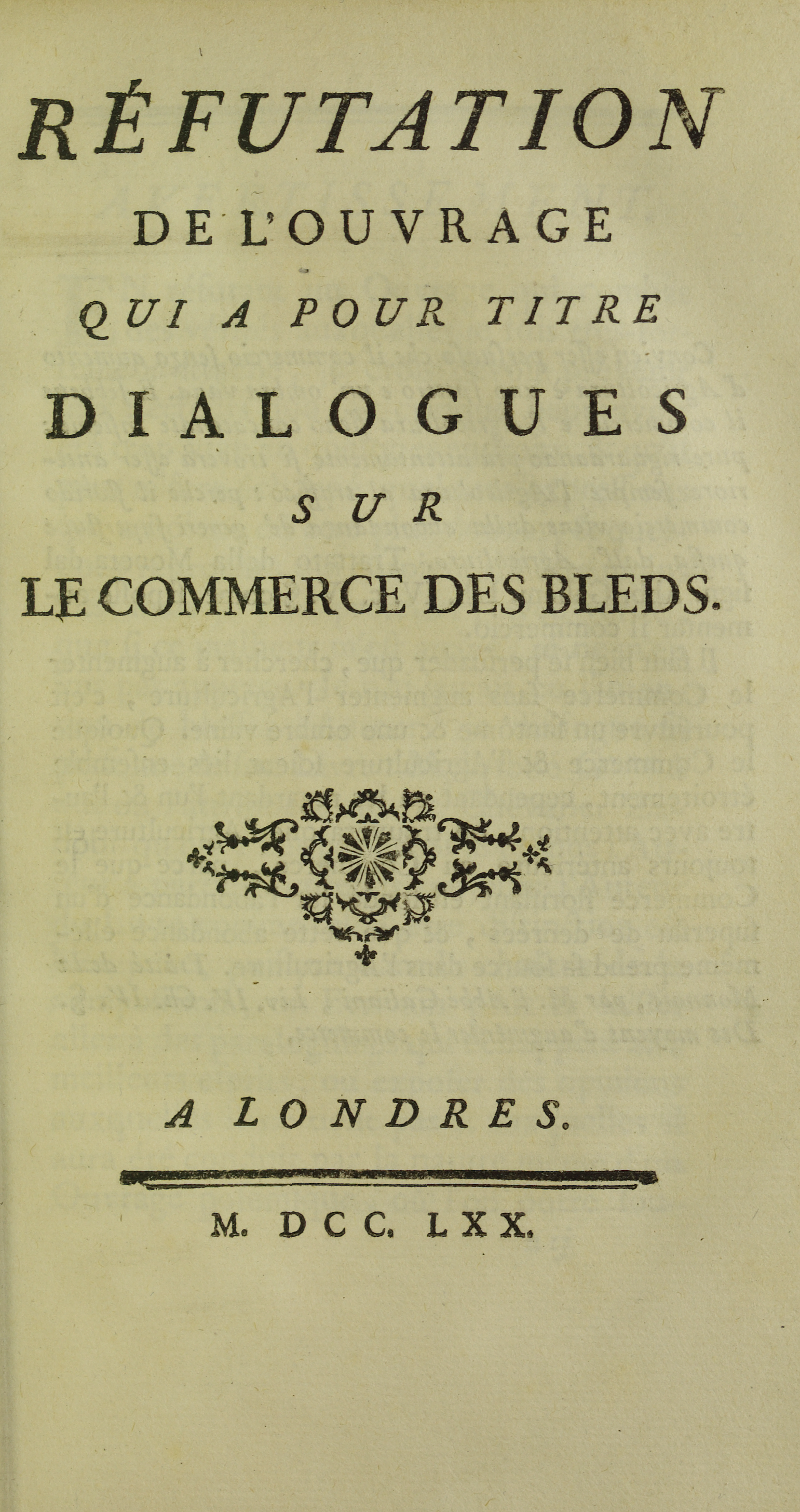
Réfutation de l'ouvrage qui a pour titre Dialogues sur le commerce des bleds, 1770

André Morellet (French: [ɑ̃dʁe mɔʁlɛ]; 7 March 1727 – 12 January 1819) was a French economist, author of various writings, contributor to the Encyclopédie and one of the last Enlightenment Age philosophes.

== Biography ==
Born at Lyon, and educated by the Jesuits there, Morellet completed his theology degree in 1752 at the Sorbonne and quickly became recognized thereafter in Parisian literary circles for his views on religious tolerance, inoculation, penal reform, liberty of the press and freedom of commerce. Morellet's early instruction by the Jesuits and his eventual clerical designation as abbé undoubtedly influenced his earliest writings in which the then 28-year-old licentiate in theology completed at least six articles, noted for their scope and length, to Volumes 6 and 7 of the Encyclopédie. A fiercely independent thinker once led Voltaire to refer to Morellet as "L'Abbé Mords-les" ("Father Bite-them") because of his sharp wit. He was a noted friend of Benjamin Franklin.

By 1754, Morellet had gradually terminated his official association with the Encyclopédie and instead redirected his attention to the French political economy. He sought to greater effect societal reforms through new writings, particularly on freedom of commerce, in which one paper stressed the importance of the textile industry (Réflexions sur les avantages de la libre fabrication et de l'usage des toiles peintes). He never abandoned the spirit of the Encyclopédie though; in the spring of 1760, Morellet wrote in defense of the Encyclopédistes who were attacked by the Le Franc de Pompignan and Charles Palissot, publishing Les Si, Les Pourquoi, La Prière universelle and the Préface de la comédie des Philosophes (the last procured Morellet a short stay in the Bastille for an alleged libel on the patroness of Palissot's.

Not all of Morellet's writings were well received. In 1765, he produced a French translation of On Crimes and Punishments. His translation was widely criticized for the liberties he took with the text. Morellet had the opinion that the Italian text of Beccaria did require some clarification. He therefore left some parts out, and sometimes added others. But he mainly changed the structure of the essay by moving, merging or splitting chapters. These interventions were known to experts, but because Beccaria himself had indicated in a letter to Morellet that he fully agreed with him, it was assumed that these adaptations also had Beccaria's consent in substance. The differences are so great, however, that the book from the hands of Morellet became quite another book than the book that Beccaria wrote.

In his later active years, Morellet was involved in quasi-diplomatic communications with English statesmen, and was elected a member of the Académie française in 1785. In 1786, he completed the translation of Thomas Jefferson's only published book, Notes on the State of Virginia (published in 1787 as Observations sur la Virginie). His firm conviction for the improvement of society never wavered; he continued to write even as outspoken critics of the French Revolution were executed publicly by the guillotine. The success of Morellet's pamphlet titled Le Cri des Families (1794), which called for the restoration of the property to families of the executed, revived his philosophical optimism and led to his next work on behalf of the dispossessed parents and grandparents of political émigrés (La Cause des pères, 1795).

In his last year, he brought out four volumes of Mélanges de littérature et de philosophie du XVIII^{e}siècle, composed chiefly of selections from his former publications, and after his death appeared his Mémoires sur le XVIII^{e}siècle et la Révolution (2 vols., 1821). At the time of his death, the ninety-one year-old had amassed a personal library of 4,736 titles, which sold at auction for 22,169 francs.

== Works ==
=== Main books ===
- De l'expression en musique (1770)
- Théorie du paradoxe (1775)
- Éloges de Madame Geoffrin, contemporaine de Mme Du Deffand, par MM. Morellet, Thomas et d'Alembert, suivis de lettres de Mme Geoffrin et à Mme Geoffrin, et d'un Essai sur la conversation (1818)
- Mélanges de littérature et de philosophie du XVIIIe (1818)
- Mémoires de l'abbé Morellet, de l'Académie française, sur le dix-huitième siècle et sur la Révolution (1821). Réédition : Mercure de France, Paris, 1988. Texte en ligne (extraits annotés) : c18.net
- Lettres inédites de l'abbé Morellet, sur l'histoire politique et littéraire des années 1806 et 1807, pour faire suite à ses Mémoires (1822)

=== Translations from English and Italian ===
- Prière universelle by Alexander Pope (1760)
- Manuel des inquisiteurs by Nicolaus Eymericus (1762). Réédition : Abrégé du manuel des inquisiteurs, Jérome Millon, 200.
- Recherches sur le style by Cesare Beccaria (1771)
- Legs d'un père à ses filles by John Gregory (1774)
- Traité des délits et des peines de Cesare Beccaria (1765) V. Ph. Audegean, Genèse et signification des délits et des peines de Beccaria, Archives de philosophie du droit, Dalloz 2010, tome 53, p. 10.
- Observations sur la Virginie de Thomas Jefferson (1786)
- L'Italien, ou le Confessional des pénitens noirs by Ann Radcliffe (1797)
- Voyage de découverte à l'Océan pacifique du Nord by George Vancouver (1798)
- Histoire de l'Amérique, livres IX et X contenant l'histoire de la Virginie jusqu'à l'année 1688 et celle de la Nouvelle-Angleterre jusqu'en 1652 by William Robertson (1798)
- Extrait du sermon prêché en Irlande, le jour de la commémoration de la mort de Charles Ier, en 1725-1726 by Jonathan Swift (1811)
- Les Enfants de l'abbaye by Regina Maria Roche (1812)
- Le Moine by Matthew Gregory Lewis (1838)
- Le Tombeau by Ann Radcliffe (1850)
