= Antonio Silla =

Italian lawyer

== Biography ==
He was born in Scanno in the region of the Abruzzo, but then belonging to the kingdom of Naples. He was born to a well-to-do family invested in herding animals. He initially studied under the Jesuits in Chieti, but moved to Naples in 1757. He was well versed in the classic languages. He would divide much of his life between Scanno and Naples. Returning in 1761 to Naples, he was accepted as a member of the Royal Academy of Sciences. He published on diverse subjects, sometimes anonymously, and often to dispute a prior thesis.

For example, in 1769 in Naples, he published a treatise on the foundation of the city, titled La fondazione di Partenope, dove si ricerca la vera origine, la religione e la polizia dell'antica citta di Napoli. In the work he argued against a notion by Michele Vargas Maciucca and Giacomo Martorelli that the city had been founded by Phoenicians, instead claiming the original town was founded by Greek colonists from nearby Cumae. In 1770, he published La Teogonia commentata followed by the four volume Storia sacra de'gentili, che comincia dalla creazione del mondo fino ai tempi di Numa Pompilio.

In 1772, he published in Naples Il diritto di punire, ossia risposta al trattato de' delitti e delle pene del signor marchese Beccaria, in which he argued against Beccarias opposition to torture and the death penalty.

In 1783, he published La pastorizia difesa arguing against internal customs and tariffs, in favor of freer commerce. He died in the town of Foggia.

== Bibliography ==
- Annastella Carrino, Dizionario Biografico degli Italiani, edited by Treccani.
