= Luigi Castiglioni =

Italian scientist, author, and politician

Luigi Castiglioni (3 October 1757–22 April 1832) was an Italian scientist, author, and statesman.

== Early life and education ==
Born into the Italian nobility in Milan, Castiglioni grew up under the tutelage of his uncle, Pietro Verri, after the death of his father. His uncle, an influential figure in the Italian enlightenment, surely inspired Castilglioni in both his scientific and political pursuits. He studied at Collegio dè Nobili, and likely pursued chemistry and botany at the University of Pavia. In 1784 he began his international travels in the pursuit of expanding his pool of knowledge out of the halls of Italian Academia. He went first to France and England before shipping off to Boston in 1785.

== Time in America ==
With his status and scholarly accolades behind him, Castiglioni entered the intellectual circles of the United States with ease: becoming acquainted with the likes of Benjamin Franklin, Thomas Jefferson, George Washington, and John Adams (among others). He earned initiation into the American Academy of Arts and Sciences and the American Philosophical Society in 1786. While in the United States, Castiglioni also found time to pen his most notable work: Viaggio negli Stati Uniti dell’ America settentrionale fatto negli anni 1785, 1786, e 1787, which he published in Milan (1790), after his return in 1787. Viaggio described the people, places, history, customs, and nature he encountered in the United States, and most notably suggested American plant life that could be beneficially introduced to the withering forests of northern Italy.

== Return to Italy and later life ==
Back in Italy, Castiglioni translated a few ancient Latin works and began running botanical experiments in his gardens. However, his peaceful scholarly existence came to an end with the outbreak of conflict in Europe: the French arrested and deported him to Nice. He turned down an appointment to the Junior Council of the Cisalpine Republic, instead he allied himself with the Italian Republic established in 1802. Hardly a staunch Republican, he continued to serve throughout the Napoleonic years. By 1796 he had a career as Director of the Municipal Botanical Garden of Milan and Director of the Royal Printing House, and he earned a seat in the Italian Kingdom’s senate in 1809, and shortly thereafter Napoleon made him a count. After the fall of Napoleon, Castiglioni went as a delegate to rally for continued Italian independence at the Allies meeting in Paris in 1814, to no success. Austria now in control of his homeland, Castiglioni’s political career may have ended, but his accolades continued to pour in: he earned a knighthood in 1819, and membership to societies all over Europe. He died and faded into relative obscurity until being rediscovered in the mid-nineteenth-century.
