= Cesare Beccaria =

Italian jurist and criminologist (1738–1794)

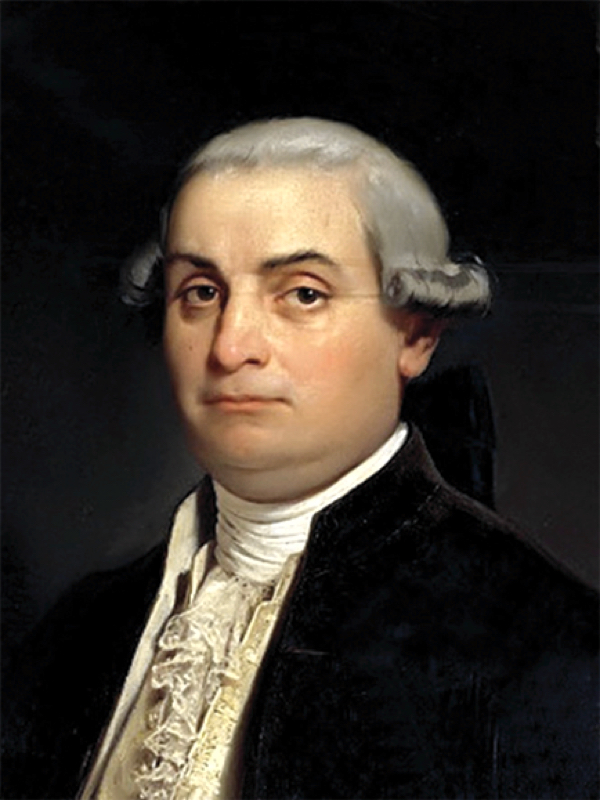
- Portrait by Eliseo Sala
- Born: Cesare Beccaria Bonesana; 15 March 1738; Milan, Duchy of Milan
- Died: 28 November 1794 (aged 56); Milan, Duchy of Milan
- Occupations: Jurist; philosopher; economist; politician; lawyer
- Spouses: Teresa Blasco; Anna Barbò
- Children: By Blasco: Giulia; Maria; Giovanni Annibale; Margherita; By Barbò: Giulio
- Relatives: Alessandro Manzoni (grandson)

Education
- Education: University of Pavia

Philosophical work
- Era: Age of Enlightenment
- Region: Western philosophy; Italian philosophy
- School: Classical school of criminology; Italian Enlightenment
- Institutions: Palazzo delle Scuole Palatine
- Main interests: Criminology
- Notable works: On Crimes and Punishments (1764)
- Notable ideas: Penology

Cesare Beccaria Bonesana, Marquis of Gualdrasco and Villareggio (Italian: [ˈtʃeːzare bekkaˈriːa, ˈtʃɛː-]; 15 March 1738 – 28 November 1794) was an Italian criminologist, jurist, philosopher, economist, and politician. He is well remembered for his treatise On Crimes and Punishments (1764), which condemned torture and the death penalty, and was a founding work in the field of penology and the classical school of criminology. Beccaria is considered the father of modern criminal law and the father of criminal justice.

According to John Bessler, Beccaria's works had a profound influence on the Founding Fathers of the United States.

== Early life and education ==
Beccaria was born in Milan on 15 March 1738 to the Marchese Gian Beccaria Bonesana, an aristocrat of moderate standing from the Austrian Habsburg Empire. Beccaria received his early education in the Jesuit college at Parma. Subsequently, he graduated in law from the University of Pavia in 1758. At first, he showed a great aptitude for mathematics, but studying Montesquieu (1689–1755) redirected his attention towards economics. In 1762, his first publication, a tract on the disorder of the currency in the Milanese states, included a proposal for its remedy.

In his mid-twenties, Beccaria became close friends with Pietro and Alessandro Verri, two brothers who with a number of other young men from the Milan aristocracy, formed a literary society named "L'Accademia dei pugni" (the Academy of Fists), a playful name which made fun of the stuffy academies that proliferated in Italy and also hinted that relaxed conversations which took place in there sometimes ended in affrays. Much of its discussion focused on reforming the criminal justice system. Through this group, Beccaria became acquainted with French and British political philosophers, such as Diderot, Helvétius, Montesquieu, and Hume. He was particularly influenced by Helvétius.

== On Crimes and Punishments ==
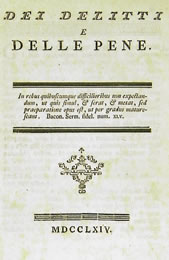
Frontpage of the original Italian edition Dei delitti e delle pene

Cesare Beccaria was best known for his book On Crimes and Punishments. In 1764, with the encouragement of Pietro Verri, Beccaria published a brief but celebrated treatise On Crimes and Punishments. Some background information was provided by Pietro, who was writing a text on the history of torture, and Alessandro Verri, a Milan prison official who had firsthand experience of the prison's appalling conditions. In this essay, Beccaria reflected the convictions of his friends in the Il Caffè (Coffee House) group, who sought reform through Enlightenment discourse.

Beccaria's treatise marked the high point of the Milan Enlightenment. In it, Beccaria put forth some of the first modern arguments against the death penalty. His treatise was also the first full work of penology, advocating reform of the criminal law system. The book was the first full-scale work to tackle criminal reform and to suggest that criminal justice should conform to rational principles. It is a less theoretical work than the writings of Hugo Grotius, Samuel von Pufendorf and other comparable thinkers, and as much a work of advocacy as of theory.

The brief work relentlessly protests against torture to obtain confessions, secret accusations, the arbitrary discretionary power of judges, the inconsistency and inequality of sentencing, using personal connections to get a lighter sentence, and the use of capital punishment for serious and even minor offences.

Almost immediately, the work was translated into French and English and went through several editions. Editions of Beccaria's text follow two distinct arrangements of the material: that by Beccaria himself, and that by French translator André Morellet (1765) who imposed a more systematic order. Morellet felt the Italian text required clarification, and therefore omitted parts, made some additions, and above all restructured the essay by moving, merging or splitting chapters. Because Beccaria indicated in a letter to Morellet that he fully agreed with him, scholars assumed that these adaptations also had Beccaria's consent in substance. The differences are so great, however, that Morellet’s version became quite another book than the book that Beccaria wrote.

Beccaria opens his work describing the great need for reform in the criminal justice system, and he observes how few studies there are on the subject of such reform. Throughout his work, Beccaria develops his position by appealing to two key philosophical theories: social contract and utility. Concerning the social contract, Beccaria argues that punishment is justified only to defend the social contract and to ensure that everyone will be motivated to abide by it. Concerning utility (perhaps influenced by Helvetius), Beccaria argues that the method of punishment selected should be that which serves the greatest public good.

Contemporary political philosophers distinguish between two principal theories of justifying punishment. First, the retributive approach maintains that punishment should be equal to the harm done, either literally an eye for an eye, or more figuratively which allows for alternative forms of compensation. The retributive approach tends to be retaliatory and vengeance-oriented. The second approach is utilitarian, which maintains that punishment should increase the total amount of happiness in the world. This often involves punishment as a means of reforming the criminal, incapacitating him from repeating his crime, and deterring others. Beccaria clearly takes a utilitarian stance. For Beccaria, the purpose of punishment is to create a better society, not revenge. Punishment serves to deter others from committing crimes and to prevent the criminal from repeating his crime.

Beccaria argues that punishment should be close in time to the criminal action to maximize the punishment's deterrence value. He defends his view about the temporal proximity of punishment by appealing to the associative theory of understanding in which our notions of causes and the subsequently perceived effects are a product of our perceived emotions that form from our observations of a causes and effect occurring in close correspondence (for more on this topic, see David Hume's work on the problem of induction, as well as the works of David Hartley). Thus, by avoiding punishments that are remote in time from the criminal action, we are able to strengthen the association between the criminal behaviour and the resulting punishment, which, in turn, discourages the criminal activity.

For Beccaria, when a punishment quickly follows a crime, then the two ideas of "crime" and "punishment" will be more closely associated in a person's mind. Also, the link between a crime and a punishment is stronger if the punishment is somehow related to the crime. Given the fact that the swiftness of punishment has the greatest impact on deterring others, Beccaria argues that there is no justification for severe punishments. In time, we will naturally grow accustomed to increases in severity of punishment, and, thus, the initial increase in severity will lose its effect. There are limits both to how much torment we can endure and also how much we can inflict.

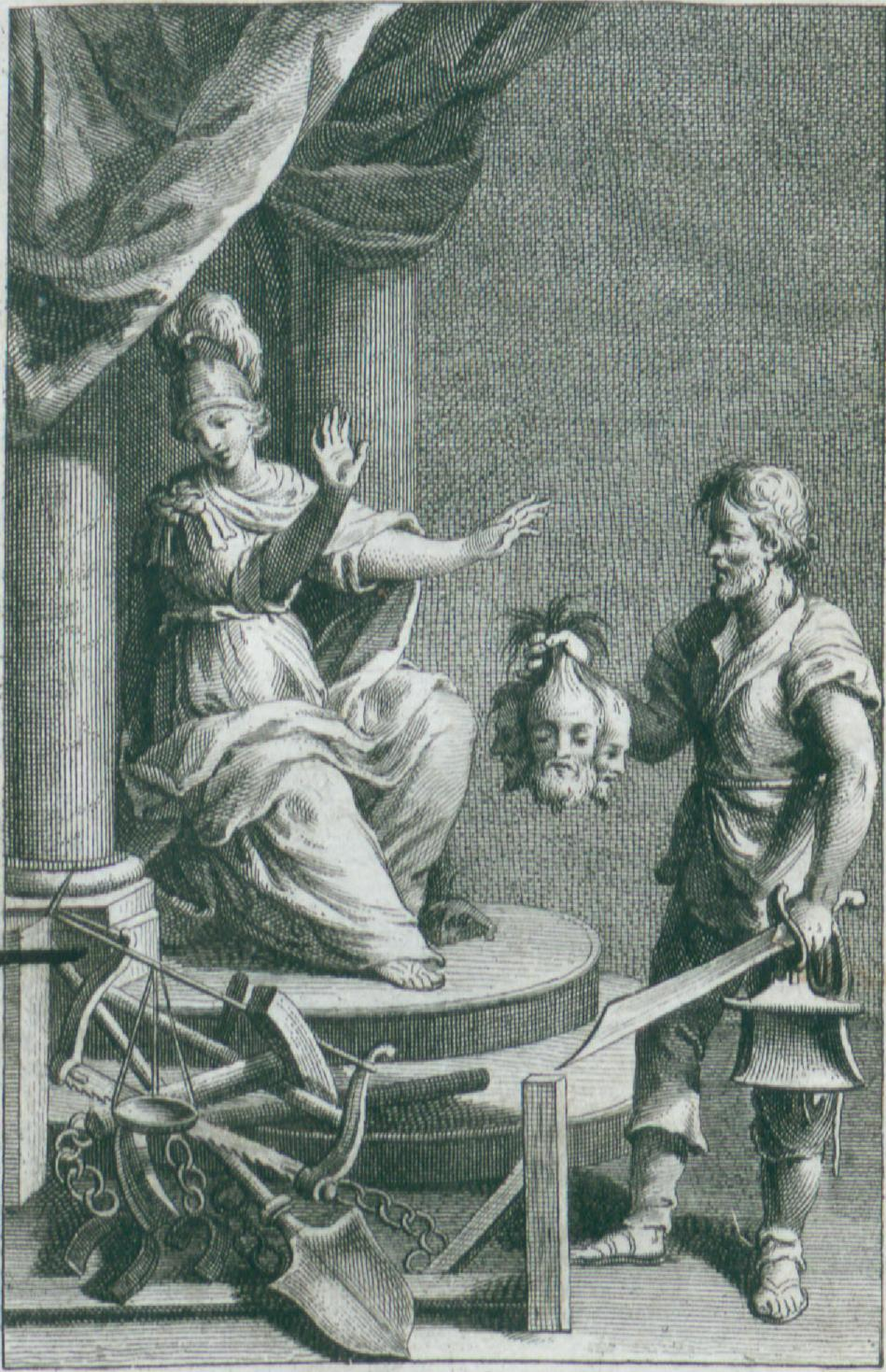
Cesare Beccaria, Dei delitti e delle pene

Beccaria touches on an array of criminal justice practices, recommending reform. For example, he argues that duelling can be eliminated if laws protected a person from insults to his honour. Laws against suicide are ineffective and thus should be eliminated, leaving the punishment of suicide to God. Bounty hunting should not be permitted since it incites people to be immoral and shows a weakness in the government. He argues that laws should be clear in defining crimes so that judges do not interpret the law, but only decide whether a law has been broken.

Punishments should be in proportion to the severity of the crime. Treason is the worst crime since it harms the social contract. This is followed by violence against a person or his property, and, finally, by public disruption. Crimes against property should be punished by fines. The best ways to prevent crimes are to enact clear and simple laws, reward virtue, and improve education.

Three tenets served as the basis of Beccaria's theories on criminal justice: free will, rational manner, and manipulability. According to Beccaria—and most classical theorists—free will enables people to make choices. Beccaria believed that people have a rational manner and apply it toward making choices that will help them achieve their own personal gratification.

In Beccaria's interpretation, law exists to preserve the social contract and benefit society as a whole. But, because people act out of self-interest and their interest sometimes conflicts with societal laws, they commit crimes. The principle of manipulability refers to the predictable ways in which people act out of rational self-interest and might therefore be dissuaded from committing crimes if the punishment outweighs the benefits of the crime, rendering the crime an illogical choice.

The principles to which Beccaria appealed were Reason, an understanding of the state as a form of contract, and, above all, the principle of utility, or of the greatest happiness for the greatest number. Beccaria had elaborated this original principle in conjunction with Pietro Verri, and greatly influenced Jeremy Bentham to develop it into the full-scale doctrine of Utilitarianism.

He openly condemned the death penalty on two grounds:

1. because the state does not possess the right to take lives; and
2. because capital punishment is neither a useful nor a necessary form of punishment.

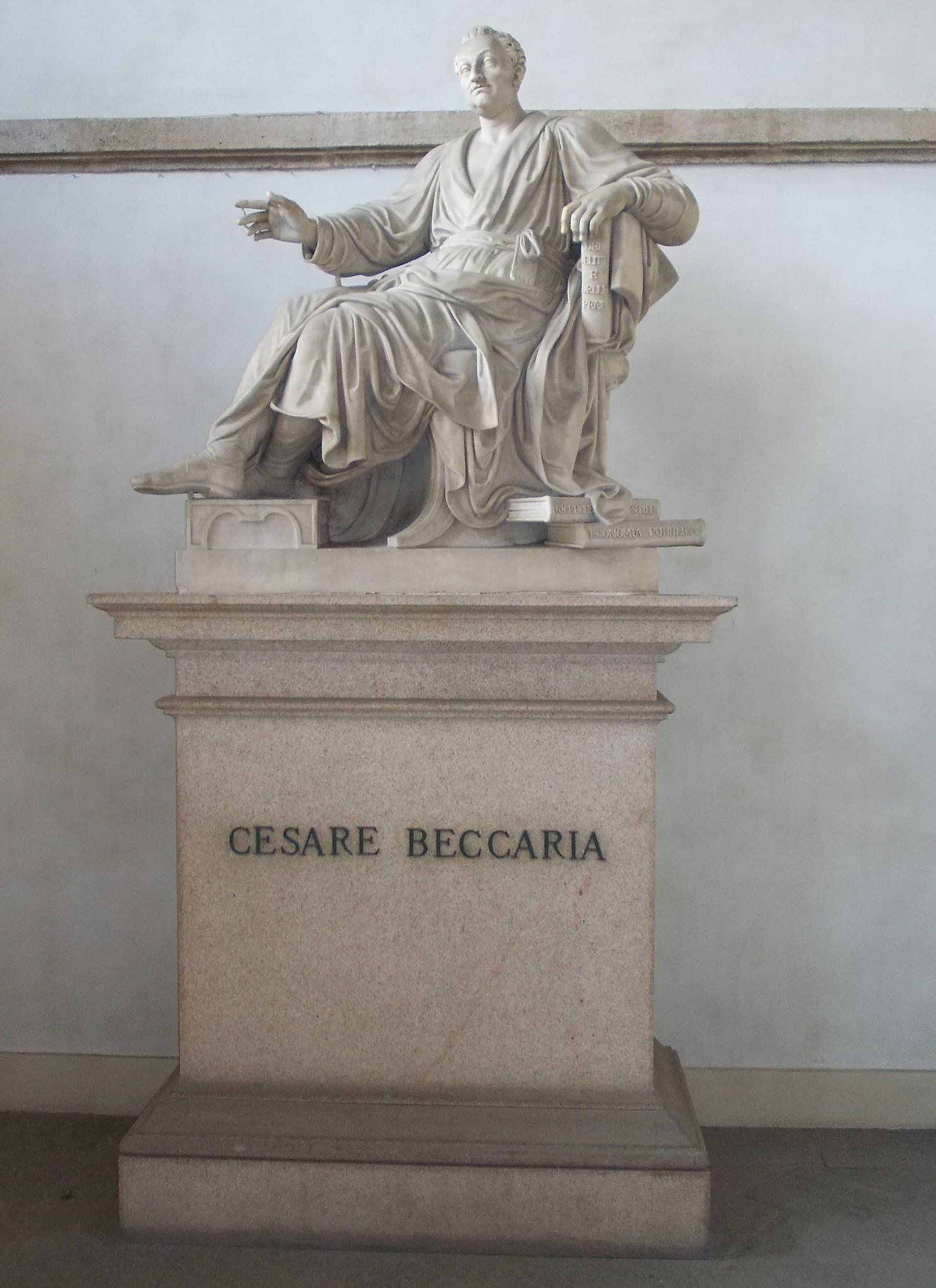
Statue of Beccaria in Pinacoteca Brera, Milan

Beccaria developed in his treatise a number of innovative and influential principles:

- Punishment has a preventive (deterrent), not a retributive, function.
- Punishment should be proportionate to the crime committed.
- A high probability of punishment, not its severity, would achieve a preventive effect.
- Procedures of criminal convictions should be public.
- Finally, in order to be effective, punishment should be prompt.

He also argued against gun control laws, and was among the first to advocate the beneficial influence of education in lessening crime. Referring to gun control laws as laws based on "false ideas of utility", Beccaria wrote, "The laws of this nature are those which forbid to wear arms, disarming those only who are not disposed to commit the crime which the laws mean to prevent." He further wrote, "[These laws] certainly makes the situation of the assaulted worse, and of the assailants better, and rather encourages than prevents murder, as it requires less courage to attack unarmed than armed persons". Thomas Jefferson noted this passage in his "Legal Commonplace Book".

As Beccaria's ideas were critical of the legal system in place at the time, and were therefore likely to stir controversy, he chose to publish the essay anonymously, for fear of government backlash. Among his contemporary critics was Antonio Silla, writing from Naples.

In the event, the treatise was extremely well received. Catherine the Great publicly endorsed it, while thousands of miles away in the United States, founding fathers Thomas Jefferson and John Adams quoted it. Once it was clear that the government approved of his essay, Beccaria republished it, this time crediting himself as the author.

== Later life and influence ==
With much hesitation, Beccaria accepted an invitation to Paris to meet the great thinkers of the day. He travelled with the Verri brothers and was given a warm reception by the philosophes. However, the chronically shy Beccaria made a poor impression and left after three weeks, returning to Milan and to his young wife Teresa and never venturing abroad again. The break with the Verri brothers proved lasting; they were never able to understand why Beccaria had left his position at the peak of success.

Beccaria nevertheless continued to command official recognition, and he was appointed to several nominal political positions in Italy. Separated from the invaluable input of his friends, he failed to produce another text of equal importance. Outside Italy, an unfounded myth grew that Beccaria's literary silence resulted from Austrian restrictions on free expression in Italy. In fact, prone to periodic bouts of depression and misanthropy, he had grown silent on his own.

Legal scholars of the time hailed Beccaria's treatise, and several European emperors were willing to follow it. Many reforms in the penal codes of the principal European nations can be traced to the treatise, but few contemporaries were convinced by Beccaria's argument against the death penalty. Even when the Grand Duchy of Tuscany abolished the death penalty, the first nation in the world to do so, it followed Beccaria's argument about the lack of utility of capital punishment, not about the state's lacking the right to execute citizens. In the anglophone world, Beccaria's ideas fed into the writings on punishment of Sir William Blackstone (selectively), and more wholeheartedly those of William Eden and Jeremy Bentham.

In November 1768, he was appointed to the chair of law and economy founded expressly for him at the Palazzo delle Scuole Palatine in Milan. His lectures on political economy, which are based on strict utilitarian principles, are in marked accordance with the theories of the English school of economists. He appears to have anticipated some concepts developed by Adam Smith and Thomas Malthus, e.g. the division of labor and the relationship between food supply and population. They are published in the collection of Italian writers on political economy (Scrittori Classici Italiani di Economia politica, vols. xi. and xii.). Beccaria never succeeded in producing another work to match Dei Delitti e Delle Pene, but he made various incomplete attempts in the course of his life. A short treatise on literary style was all he saw to press.

In 1771, Beccaria was made a member of the supreme economic council, and in 1791, he was appointed to the board for the reform of the judicial code, where he made a valuable contribution. During this period he spearheaded a number of important reforms, such as the standardisation of weights and measurements. One of Beccaria's reports influenced the later adoption of the metric system in France.

In his later years, Beccaria had to deal with health problems and family troubles. His wife had died in 1774, and he remarried three months later. He engaged in years-long litigation because of property disputes initiated by his two brothers and sister. He enthusiastically greeted the French Revolution at first, but he was shocked by the Reign of Terror. He died in Milan on 28 November 1794.

A pioneer in criminology, his influence during his lifetime extended to shaping the rights listed in the US Constitution and Bill of Rights. On Crimes and Punishments served as a useful guide to the Founding Fathers.

Beccaria's theories, as expressed in On Crimes and Punishments, have continued to play a great role in recent times. Some of the current policies impacted by his theories are truth in sentencing, swift punishment and the abolition of the death penalty in dozens of countries. While many of his theories are popular, some are still a source of heated controversy, even more than two centuries after the famed criminologist's death.

== Family ==
Beccaria's grandson was Alessandro Manzoni, the noted Italian novelist and poet who wrote, among other things, The Betrothed, one of the first Italian historical novels, and "Il cinque maggio", a poem on Napoleon's death.

== Commemorations ==
- Beccaria Township in central Pennsylvania, United States, is named for him.
- Piazza Beccaria, a large square in Florence, Italy, is also named for him.

== See also ==
- Capital punishment in Italy
- Leopoldine Code
