= On Crimes and Punishments =

1764 treatise by Cesare Beccaria

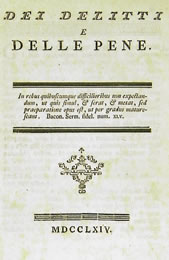
Frontpage of the original Italian edition Dei delitti e delle pene

On Crimes and Punishments (Italian: Dei delitti e delle pene [dei deˈlitti e ddelle ˈpeːne]) is a treatise written by Cesare Beccaria in 1764.

The treatise condemned torture and the death penalty and was a founding work in the field of penology.

== History ==
Beccaria and the two brothers Pietro and Alessandro Verri started an important cultural reformist movement centered around their journal Il Caffè ('The Coffee House'), which ran from the summer of 1764 for about two years, and was inspired by Addison and Steele's literary magazine The Spectator and other such journals. Il Caffè represented an entirely new cultural moment in Northern Italy. With their Enlightenment rhetoric and their balance between topics of socio-political and literary interest, the anonymous contributors held the interest of the educated classes in Italy, introducing recent thought such as that of Voltaire and Denis Diderot.

On Crimes and Punishments marked the high point of the Milan Enlightenment. In it, Beccaria put forth some of the first modern arguments against the death penalty. It was also the first full work of penology, advocating reform of the criminal law system. The book was the first full-scale work to tackle criminal reform and to suggest that criminal justice should conform to rational principles. It is a less theoretical work than the writings of Hugo Grotius, Samuel von Pufendorf and other comparable thinkers, and as much a work of advocacy as of theory. In this essay, Beccaria reflected on the convictions of the Il Caffè group, who sought to cause reform through Enlightenment discourse. In 1765, André Morellet produced a French translation of On Crimes and Punishments. His translation was widely criticized for the liberties he took with the text.

Morellet believed that the Italian text of Beccaria required some clarification. He, therefore, omitted parts and sometimes added to them. However, he mainly changed the structure of the essay by moving, merging, or splitting chapters. These interventions were known to experts, but because Beccaria himself had indicated in a letter to Morellet that he fully agreed with him, it was assumed that these adaptations also had Beccaria's consent in substance. The differences are so great, however, that the book from the hands of Morellet became quite another book than the book that Beccaria wrote.

== Principles ==
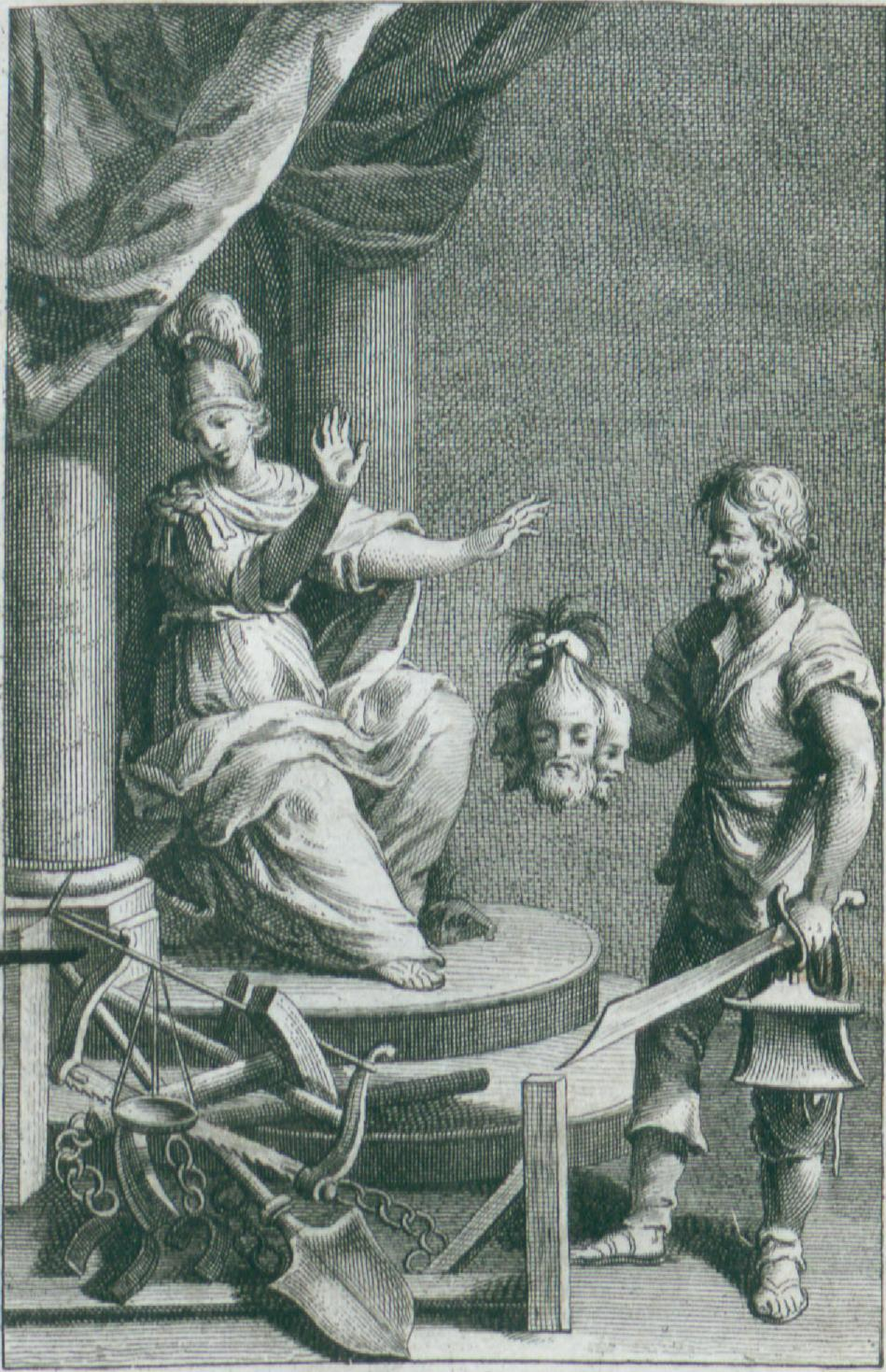
Illustration from the 6th edition

On Crimes and Punishments was the first critical analysis of capital punishment that demanded its abolition. Beccaria described the death penalty as:

the war of a nation against a citizen ... It appears absurd to me that the laws, which are the expression of the public will and which detest and punish homicide, commit murder themselves, and in order to dissuade citizens from assassination, commit public assassination.

Beccaria cited Montesquieu, who stated that "every punishment which does not arise from absolute necessity is tyrannical".

Regarding the "Proportion between Crimes and Punishment", Beccaria stated that:

Crimes of every kind should be less frequent, in proportion to the evil they produce to society ... If an equal punishment be ordained for two crimes that injure society in different degrees, there is nothing to deter men from committing the greater as often as it is attended with greater advantage.

Beccaria also argued against torture, believing it was cruel and unnecessary. He wrote: "what right… other than the right of force, gives a judge the power to inflict punishment on a citizen while the question of his guilt or innocence is still in doubt?" He observed that torture makes a person's capacity to withstand pain the criterion for truth; that it carries a great risk of torturing an innocent person; and that a person will confess to anything to stop their suffering while being tortured.

== Style ==
The book's serious message is put across in a clear and animated style, particularly upon a deep sense of humanity and urgency at unjust suffering. This humane sentiment is what makes Beccaria appeal for rationality in the laws.

Suicide is a crime which seems not to admit of punishment, properly speaking; for it cannot be inflicted but on the innocent, or upon an insensible dead body. In the first case, it is unjust and tyrannical, for political liberty supposes all punishments entirely personal; in the second, it has the same effect, by way of example, as the scourging a statue. Mankind love life too well; the objects that surround them, the seducing phantom of pleasure, and hope, that sweetest error of mortals, which makes men swallow such large draughts of evil, mingled with a very few drops of good, allure them too strongly, to apprehend that this crime will ever be common from its unavoidable impunity. The laws are obeyed through fear of punishment, but death destroys all sensibility. What motive then can restrain the desperate hand of suicide?...But, to return: – If it be demonstrated that the laws which imprison men in their own country are vain and unjust, it will be equally true of those which punish suicide; for that can only be punished after death, which is in the power of God alone; but it is no crime with regard to man, because the punishment falls on an innocent family. If it be objected, that the consideration of such a punishment may prevent the crime, I answer, that he who can calmly renounce the pleasure of existence, who is so weary of life as to brave the idea of eternal misery, will never be influenced by the more distant and less powerful considerations of family and children.

— Of Crimes and Punishments

== Influence ==
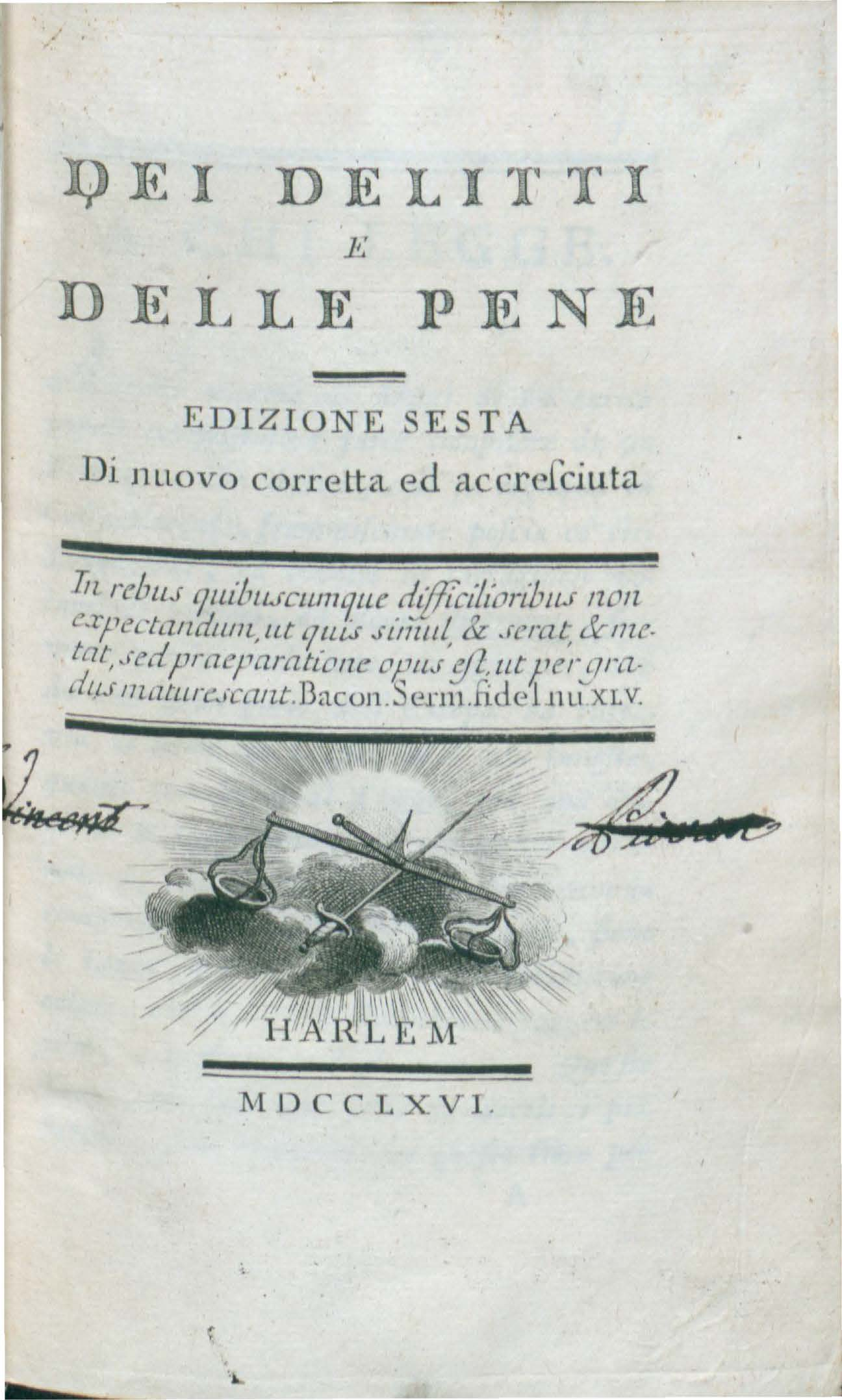
Dei delitti e delle pene (1766), title page, 6th edition

Within eighteen months, the book passed through six editions. It was translated into French in 1766 and published with an anonymous commentary by Voltaire. An English translation appeared in 1767, and it was translated into several other languages. The book was read by all the luminaries of the day, including, in the United States, by John Adams and Thomas Jefferson.

The book's principles influenced thinking on criminal justice and punishment of offenders, leading to reforms in Europe, especially in France and at the court of Catherine II of Russia. In England, Beccaria's ideas fed into the writings on punishment of Sir William Blackstone (selectively), and more wholeheartedly those of William Eden (Lord Auckland) and Jeremy Bentham. The reforms he had advocated led to the abolition of the death penalty in the Grand Duchy of Tuscany, the first state in the world to take this measure.

Thomas Jefferson, in his Commonplace Book, copied a passage from Beccaria related to the issue of the right to bear arms: "Laws that forbid the carrying of arms ... disarm only those who are neither inclined nor determined to commit crimes ... Such laws make things worse for the assaulted and better for the assailants; they serve rather to encourage than to prevent homicides, for an unarmed man may be attacked with greater confidence than an armed man." His only notation on this passage was "False idee di utilità" ("false ideas of utility").
