= François de Baillou =

- Born: c. 1700
- Died: 1774
- Occupations: Scientific instrument maker, optician
- Known for: Manufacturing microscopes, telescopes, camera obscuras, and magic lanterns
- Title: Regio Cesareo Ottico (Imperial Optician)

François de Baillou (ca. 1700-1774) was a French scientific instrument makers.

Born into a French family settled in Milan, François de Baillou conducted research on a wide range of scientific topics. A distinguished optician, he produced numerous microscopes and telescopes in a period of thirty years (1734-1764). In 1750, he received the title of "Regio Cesareo Ottico" [Imperial Optician] from Empress Maria Theresa of Austria (1717-1780) via Count Harnach, Governor of Milan. From his published booklets on his optical instruments, we learn that he made mono- and binocular telescopes of various sizes and in different versions (theater, pocket, astronomical, terrestrial), simple and compound microscopes, camera obscuras and magic lanterns, and lenses and cylinders for anamorphoses. Many of Baillou's instruments are now preserved in public and private collections.
