= Philosophes =

Intellectuals of the 18th-century Enlightenment

The philosophes (French for 'philosophers') were the intellectuals of the 18th-century European Enlightenment. Few were primarily philosophers; rather, philosophes were public intellectuals who applied reason to the study of many areas of learning, including philosophy, history, science, politics, economics, and social issues. They had a critical eye and looked for weaknesses and failures that needed improvement. They promoted a "Republic of Letters" that crossed national boundaries and allowed intellectuals to freely exchange books and ideas. Most philosophes were men, but some were women.

They strongly endorsed progress and tolerance, as they distrusted organized religion (most were deists) and feudal institutions. Many contributed to Diderot's Encyclopédie. They faded away after the French Revolution reached a violent stage in 1793.

== Characterization ==
Philosophe is the French word for "philosopher," and was a word that the French Enlightenment thinkers usually applied to themselves. The philosophes, like many ancient philosophers, were public intellectuals dedicated to solving the world's real problems. They wrote on subjects ranging from current affairs to art criticism, wrote in every conceivable format. The Swiss philosophe Jean-Jacques Rousseau, for example, wrote a political tract, a treatise on education, constitutions for Poland and Corsica, an analysis of the effects of the theater on public morals, a best-selling novel, an opera, and a highly influential autobiography. The philosophes wrote for a broadly educated public of readers who snatched up every Enlightenment book they could find at their local booksellers, even when rulers or churches tried to forbid such works.

Between 1740 and 1789, the Enlightenment acquired its name and gained support in the highest reaches of government despite heated conflicts between the philosophes and state and religious authorities. Although philosophe is a French word, the Enlightenment was distinctly cosmopolitan; philosophes could be found from Philadelphia to Saint Petersburg. The philosophes considered themselves part of a grand "republic of letters" that transcended national political boundaries. In 1784, the German philosopher Immanuel Kant summed up the program of the Enlightenment in two Latin words: sapere aude, "dare to know", meaning, dare to think for yourself. The philosophes used reason to attack superstition, bigotry, and religious fanaticism, which they considered the chief obstacles to free thought and social reform. Voltaire took religious fanaticism as his chief target: "Once fanaticism has corrupted a mind, the malady is almost incurable" and that "the only remedy for this epidemic malady is the philosophical spirit".

Enlightenment writers did not necessarily oppose organized religion, but they strenuously objected to religious intolerance. They believed that a society based around reason instead of religious fanaticism would improve the way people think and culminate in a more critical, scientific outlook on social issues and problems. The philosophes believed that the dissemination of knowledge would encourage reform in every aspect of life, from the grain trade to the penal system. Chief among their desired reforms was intellectual freedom—the freedom to use one's reason and to publish the results. The philosophes wanted freedom of the press and freedom of religion, which they considered "natural rights" guaranteed by "natural law." In their view, progress depended on these freedoms.

== Usage in modern English ==
The word "philosophe" has been used in English since the Middle Ages. Horace Walpole in 1779 remarked that "[t]he philosophes, except Buffon, are solemn, arrogant, dictatorial coxcombs."

Scholars differ concerning whether the word should be applied to all Enlightenment thinkers or be restricted to only the philosophers of French culture. Historian Peter Gay, for example, uses it to apply to all Enlightenment philosophers "from Edinburgh to Naples, Paris to Berlin, Boston to Philadelphia".

== Notable philosophes ==
- John Locke (1632–1704)
- Baruch Spinoza (1632–1677)
- Charles Montesquieu (1689–1755)
- Voltaire (1694–1778)
- Benjamin Franklin (1706–1790)
- Gabriel Bonnot de Mably (1709–1785)
- David Hume (1711–1776)
- Jean-Jacques Rousseau (1712–1778)
- Denis Diderot (1713–1784)
- Claude Adrien Helvétius (1715–1771)
- Jean le Rond d'Alembert (1717–1783)
- Baron d'Holbach (1723–1789)
- Adam Smith (1723–1790)
- Immanuel Kant (1724–1804)
- Thomas Paine (1737–1809)
- Cesare Beccaria (1738–1794)
- Marquis de Condorcet (1743–1794)
- Francesco Mario Pagano (1748–1799)
- Mary Wollstonecraft (1759–1797)
- Henri de Saint-Simon (1760–1825)
- Charles Fourier (1772–1837)

== See also ==
- Enlightenment philosophy
- Idea of Progress
- The Enlightenment
