= Kingdom of Sicily under Savoy =

1713–1720 period of Sicily

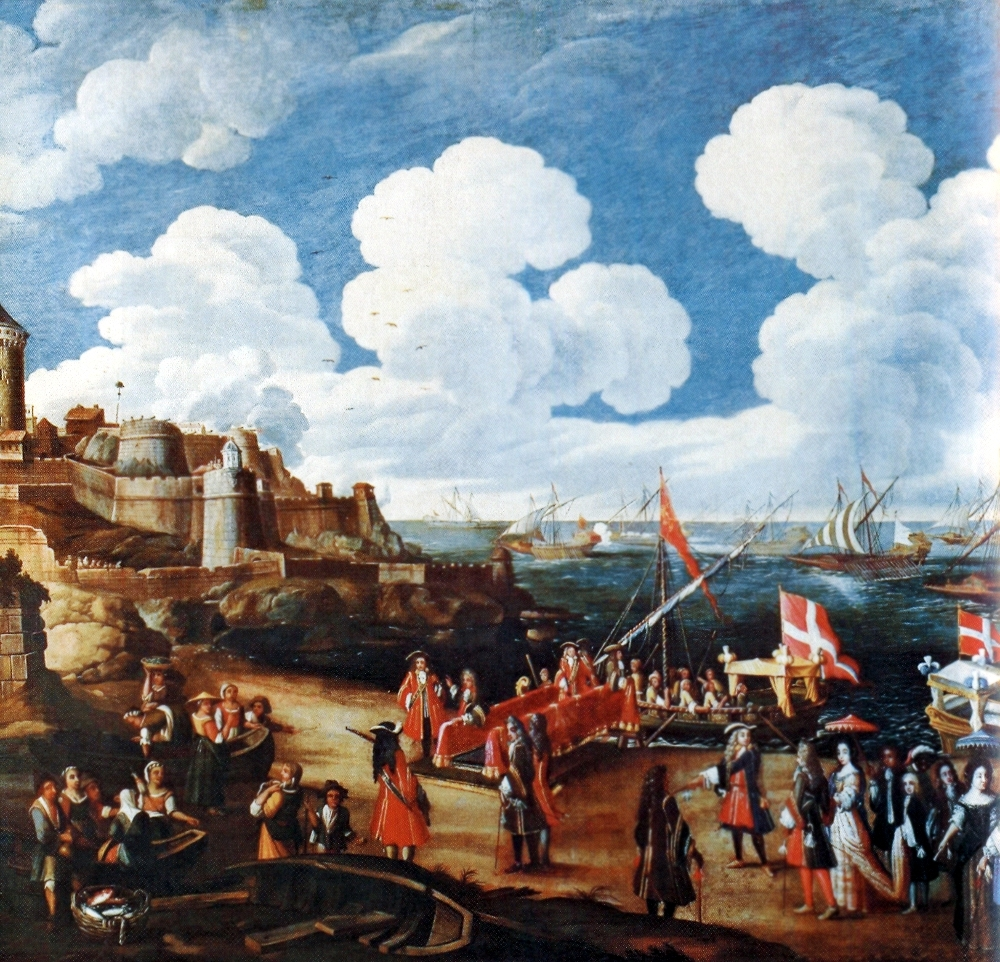
Victor Amadeus II and his wife departing Nice with a British naval squadron for Palermo to be crowned King and Queen of Sicily.

The Kingdom of Sicily was ruled by the House of Savoy from 1713 until 1720, although they lost control of it in 1718 and did not relinquish their title to it until 1723. The only king of Sicily from the House of Savoy was Victor Amadeus II. Throughout this period Sicily remained a distinct realm in personal union with the other Savoyard states, but ultimately it secured for the House of Savoy a royal title and a future of expansion in Italy rather than in France. During this period, the Savoyard monarch used his new title to affirm his sovereign independence.

Victor Amadeus's policy towards Sicily was to bring it more in line with his mainland possessions, but to this end he progressed little in the short span of time he had. His own domain was weakened by the addition of Sicily, becoming more fragmented and extended (geographically), and more composite (legally and socially). He was finally forced to renounce Sicily in exchange for Sardinia.

== Acquisition of Sicily by the House of Savoy ==
The death of Prince Joseph Ferdinand, heir to the Spanish Empire, on 6 February 1699 rendered the First Partition Treaty of 1698 inoperative. In subsequent negotiations, King Louis XIV of France proposed that Victor Amadeus II cede his lands to France in exchange for the kingdoms of Sicily and Naples, both possessions of the Spanish. This proposal was rejected by Victor Amadeus, who was unwilling to part with the Principality of Piedmont, although he was willing to cede the Duchy of Savoy and County of Nice. The succession question was unsolved at the death of Charles II of Spain and the War of the Spanish Succession broke out. During the war, Savoy allied with England and its successor state Great Britain against France. When peace negotiations began in 1709, the British argued, partly in their own interests as well as those of Savoy, for giving the Savoyards the thrones of Sicily and Naples. Victor Amadeus' real interest was in acquiring the Duchy of Milan. In 1710 at Geertruydenberg, the Dutch pensionary Anthonie Heinsius and the Imperial envoy Karl von Zinzendorf mooted proposals for the Savoyard acquisition of Milan or Sicily. The Savoyard ambassador, the Marchese del Borgo, suggested exchanging the Savoyard state for Naples, Sicily and the Spanish-held State of the Presidi in central Italy.

After a final effort by the British to make Victor Amadeus the King of Spain, Queen Anne informed the Savoyard ambassador Conte Annibale Maffei on 23 June 1712 that the British intended to give him Sicily. The French were informed the same day, and on 4 September Philip V of Spain consented to relinquish his claim on Sicily. The division of the Spanish empire was designed in part to recognise Savoy's claim to the Spanish inheritance, but more to strike a balance of power in favour of her ally, Britain. As historian Geoffrey Symcox noted, Victor Amadeus "would be bound by the Anglo-French agreement not to dispose of the island or exchange it for other territory, which showed that he had been installed there not in full sovereignty but as guardian of British interests, at Britain's pleasure." These limitations were written into the subsequent Treaty of Utrecht (11 April 1713) between France and Savoy. In the interim the new king had attempted to exchange it for territory closer to his Piedmontese domains. He rejected a British offer to provide garrisons for the island, and he concluded a treaty on 8 March 1713 confirming to British merchants no more commercial rights than they had exercised under the Spanish. The formal handover of power was conducted on 10 June, and a final treaty of peace between Savoy and Spain was signed on 13 July. Victor Amadeus was made the heir to the Spanish empire if Philip produced no heirs. Philip retained "second sovereignty" over several fiefs in Sicily, lands he had seized from pro-Habsburg vassals during the war, such as the County of Modica. The end of the war and Victor Amadeus' rise in status were celebrated in the streets of Turin from 1–3 August, ending in gun salutes, fireworks and a Te Deum.

== Rule of Victor Amadeus II ==
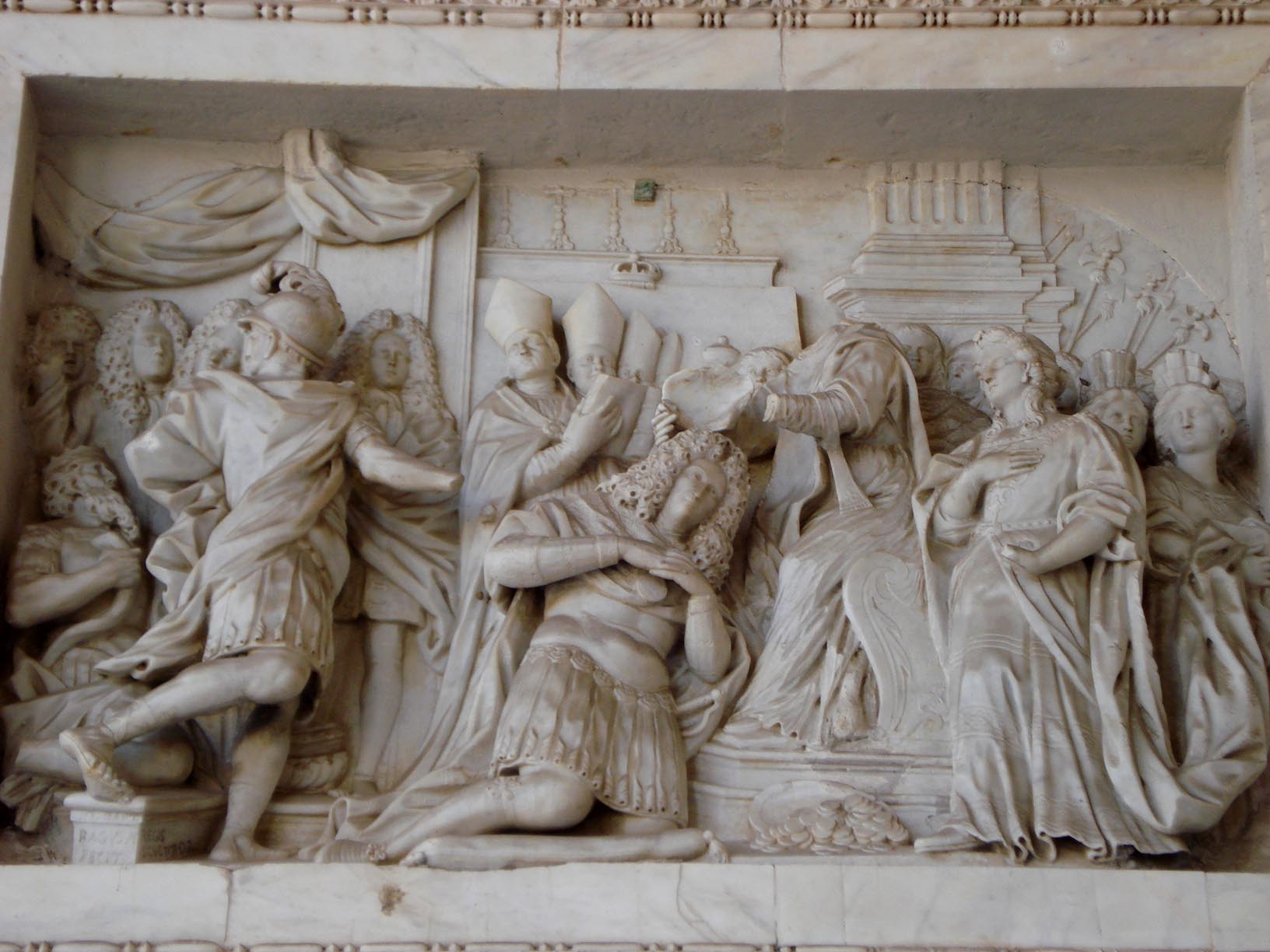
Relief depicting Victor Amadeus' coronation in Palermo, from the southern portico of the cathedral of Palermo.

=== Personal rule ===
In October 1713, Victor Amadeus and his wife, Anne Marie d'Orléans, travelled with a British squadron from Nice to Palermo to take personal possession of their new kingdom. The last Spanish viceroy evacuated his troops, and the new king's arrival was greeted with jubilation. The king and queen were crowned in the cathedral of Palermo on 24 December. Victor Amadeus' short stay in Palermo was a disappointment: "[h]is court was drab and parsimonious, affording little profit or delight to the people of Palermo [and t]he key positions in the government went to natives of his mainland dominions." In February 1714 the Sicilian Parliament convened to swear an oath of allegiance to their new sovereign. Victor Amadeus also received the Maltese falcon, the customary tribute of the Knights of Malta to their Sicilian overlord.

Among the first things the new king did was improve the defences of the island in light of the threat of the Kingdom of Naples, now ruled by the Habsburgs, who did not recognise the treaty of Utrecht. In September 1714 he ordered a census of people, animals and rents; the population came to 1,135,120. Although it received Piedmontese aid to meet its budget, Sicily was found to have surpluses of grain, olive oil and raw silk, and Palermo was a centre of manufacturing and a thriving port. The Piedmontese contadore generale Gian Giacomo Fontana was placed in charge of Sicily's finances and immediately began a reform of the tax system and the corrupt Palermitan customs office, although Victor Amadeus refused to reduce taxes, export tariffs and gabelles. The parliament was even induced to order a series of donativi (special taxes) to pay for the new government, and advised more rigorous sumptuary laws.

At the advice of parliament, Victor Amadeus raised a small volunteer army, consisting of two regiments and a bodyguard, and, on a visit in June 1714, restored to Messina its privileges, lost in the revolt of 1674–76, and declared it a free port. He also began the expansion of the navy, which at the start of his reign consisted of one galley, to which he added three and four sailing ships, two built in Sicily. With the accession of George I of Great Britain (12 August) and the Whigs, the Sicilians could no longer rely on the Mediterranean Fleet to guard their island and the naval buildup became central to Sicilian security. When the Treaty of Rastatt (7 March) made peace between the Habsburgs and France, the threat of a Neapolitan invasion grew. On 8 September 1714, Victor Amadeus left Palermo for Villefranche, leaving behind Maffei as his viceroy. When he laid the foundation stone of the Basilica of Superga in Turin on 20 July 1717, it read:

Alla Madre del Salvatore Alla Salvatrice di Torino Vittorio Amedeo, Re di Sicilia, di Gerusalemme e di Cipro posava la prima pietra il giorno 20 luglio 1717	To the Mother of the Savior To the Saving Lady of Turin Victor Amadeus, King of Sicily, Jerusalem and Cyprus laid the first stone on 20 July 1717

=== Rule by viceroys ===
At Victor Amadeus' leaving, many problems with the government of Sicily remained. The Palermitan bureaucracy, and the aristocracy of which its officials formed a part, had been alienated by the crackdown on corruption. The populace remained pro-Spanish and Spanish propaganda was being disseminated from enclaves like Modica. The viceroy Maffei was left with little power to effect reform, but with 10,000 Piedmontese troops stationed on the island by 1718 he had the resources to suppress the endemic brigandage.

In 1717 Victor Amadeus placed the Direttore delle Finanze, the finance minister of Sicily, under the authority of the Generale delle Finanze, the finance minister of his mainland dominions at Turin, and ordered him to adopt Piedmontese accounting practices. This alarmed the baronage, which comprised only about seventy to eighty families. These families controlled both the parliament and the cities, and owned vast tracts of land farmed by a destitute peasantry. The Sicilian system was latifundist and feudal. The Savoyard reforms had barely begun when the island was lost in 1718.

List of Savoyard viceroys

- 1714–1718 Annibale Maffei, Count
- 1718–1719 Jean François de Bette, Marquis of Lede
- 1719–1720 Niccolò Pignatelli, Duke of Monteleone

=== Ecclesiastical politics ===
The kings of Sicily had since Norman times possessed the status of an apostolic legate in their kingdom. This special prerogative in ecclesiastical matters was exercised through the Tribunal of the Monarchy. When Victor Amadeus became king, Pope Clement XI, who regarded Sicily as a Papal fief, refused to recognise him. At the same time, the Tribunal was in the midst of a dispute with the Bishop of Lipari, ongoing since 1711, which had in turn led to Papal intervention:

In 1711 the bishop had excommunicated some customs officials for levying duty on a couple of pounds of chickpeas belonging to his household. The Tribunal nullified the excommunication, whereupon the bishop imposed an interdict on his diocese and left to seek help in Rome. The Roman Curia issued a declaration denying the Tribunal's power to lift ecclesiastical sanctions, which was published early in 1712 by several Sicilian bishops. Counter-measures duly followed from the Spanish viceroy and the Tribunal, so that by the time Victor Amadeus reached Sicily the Archbishop of Messina and the bishops of Agrigento and Catania had followed their colleague into exile, the last two leaving their sees under interdict.

The Savoyard king sent envoys to Rome in December 1713, seeking to settle the conflict and minimise the effects of the interdicts. In March 1714 the parliament advised him not to allow the Tribunal's powers to be diminished. Clement XI in turn forbade the clergy to pay the crociata, an ancient tax to the monarch, ostensibly for a Crusade. He demanded that Victor Amadeus accept investiture as a vassal of the Pope and in August and November he re-published the interdicts. On 20 January 1715 Clement published a bull abolishing the Tribunal. Pro-papal clergy, who formed a large majority in the diocese of Agrigento, were imprisoned or exiled (most travelling o Rome), and when the Savoyard government published an anti-papal tract written by two clergyment it ignited a pamphlet war. The island clergy was divided, the populace supported the government, and the French and Spanish governments support Victor Amadeus. In June 1716 Clement offered to rescind his bull of the previous year if he could choose the head of the Tribunal, but as he would still not recognise Victor Amadeus' right to the crown the offer was rejected. The situation was unsettled at the time the Savoyards' lost Sicily.

== Loss of Sicily to Spain and Austria ==
=== Sicily in negotiations ===
In February 1716, the British minister James Stanhope and the Savoyard ambassador Franceco Giuseppe Wicardel de Triviè met to discuss a "southern peace plan". Stanhope later claimed that Victor Amadeus had been willing to cede Sicily to the Emperor Charles VI, head of the Habsburgs, in exchange for Sardinia and recognition of his royal title. This was not the case, however, as Trivié had asked for British assistance in defending the island from the Ottoman Empire, then engaged in the Second Morean War against the Republic of Venice. When John Dalrymple and Carlo Filippo Perrone di San Marino, respectively British and Savoyard ambassadors at Paris, discussed the question of a final agreement between Savoy and the Emperor, Sicily was ignored, as Victor Amadeus had no intention of ceding it.

In June 1716 George I and Charles VI signed a treaty guaranteeing mutual respect for any future acquisitions each might make, Stanhope explained to Trivié that his master might be forced to cede Sicily to Charles. A Savoyard embassy to the British court failed to extract the sought promise of a British defence of Sicily in the event of an imperial invasion. When George I and Louis XV of France signed the Treaty of Hanover in November, it contained a secret provision for the cession of Sicily to the emperor. In January 1717 the Triple Alliance was formed between Britain, France and the Dutch Republic. The emperor began asking for a return of the Duchy of Montferrat, which had gone to Savoy in 1703. In the summer of 1717 a secret Savoyard embassy was sent to Vienna, to the house of Prince Eugene of Savoy, to ask for a Habsburg princess's hand in marriage and the cession of Vigevanasco, an imperial-held territory in Italy in return for Savoy's joining the Triple Alliance. Prince Eugene did not even pass it on.

=== Spanish conquest of Sicily ===
In July 1717 the Spanish attacked Sardinia, while Austria was embroiled in a war with the Ottomans. By November the entire island has been subdued. In December Victor Amadeus sent another embassy to Vienna, but the Spanish minister Giulio Alberoni urged him to invade the long-coveted Duchy of Milan, promising Spanish assistance. It was a ruse to distract the Savoyards from the planned Spanish invasion of Sicily.

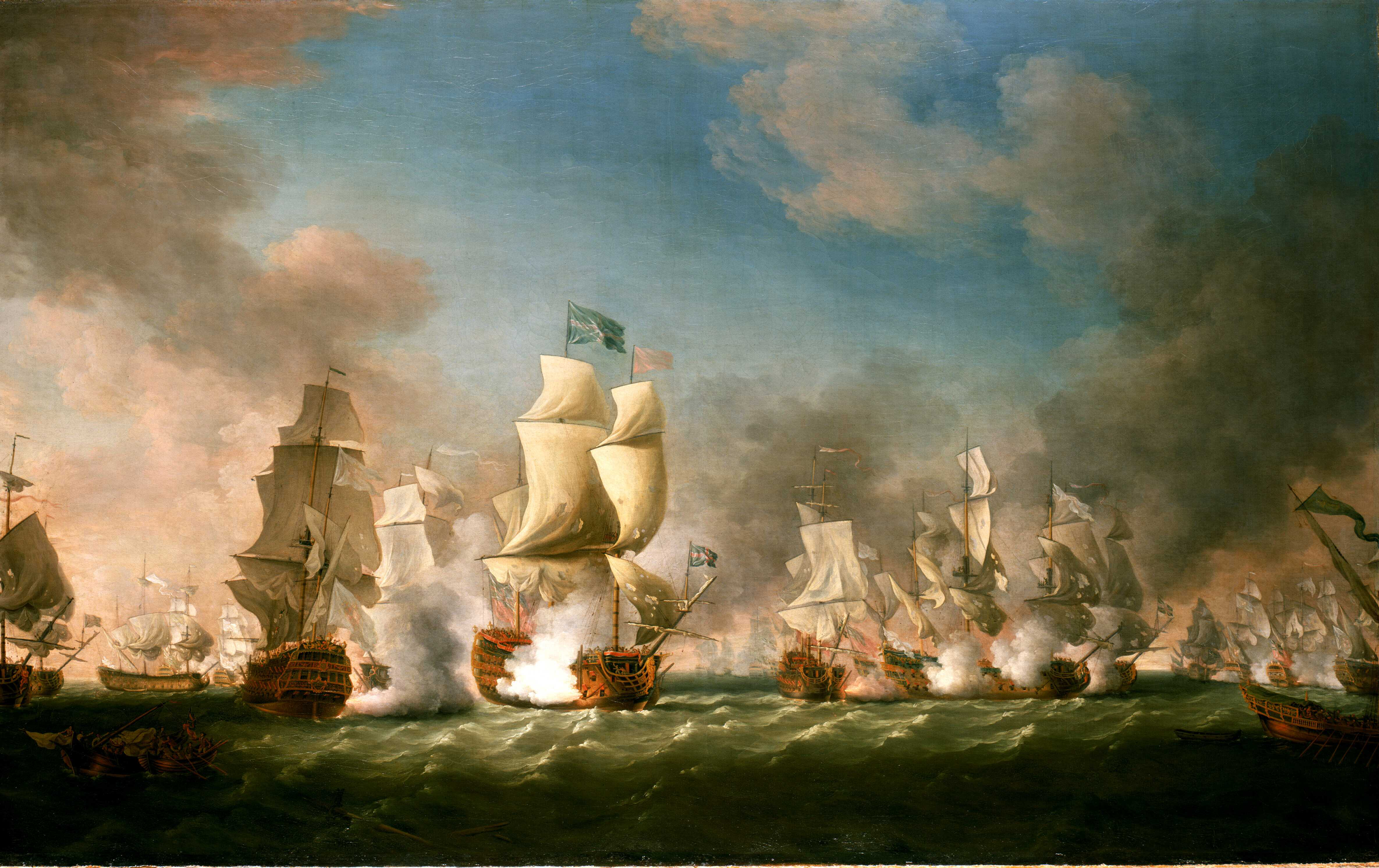
The Battle of Cape Passaro by Richard Paton.

In January 1718 the Conte Filippo d'Ussolo was sent to Vienna to negotiate an alliance with the emperor, but he exceeded his mandate by broaching the cession of Sicily, and was replaced at the end of April by Gian Giacomo Fontana. Now Victor Amadeus offered to cede Sicily in exchange for Sardinia and Vigevanasco, and Fontana, empowered to make an alternative suggestion, offered to exchange all Savoyard possessions on the mainland for Sardinia and Naples. By the time these offers received a hearing in June the emperor had adhered to the Triple Alliance, and the War of the Quadruple Alliance had begun. On 1 July the Spanish landed at Palermo. Greeted as liberators, they quickly expelled the Savoyard troops; only Milazzo put up any resistance, being reinforced by Austrian troops, until it fell on 15 October. On 2 August, Charles VI made peace with the Ottomans. On 7 August, Victor Amadeus sent the Marquis de Saint-Thomas to Vienna to offer Sicily in exchange for Parma and Tuscany, but he was rebuffed. On 11 August, the British fleet defeated the Spanish at the Battle of Cape Passaro, stranding the Spanish troops on Sicily. After numerous failed efforts to avert the inevitable in London and Paris, Victor Amadeus acceded to the Quadruple Alliance on 8 November 1718.

After imperial forces launched a counter-invasion of Sicily, the viceroy Maffei formally handed over control of the island in May 1719. On 17 February 1720 the Treaty of the Hague brought an end to the war by forcing Spain (and Savoy, which was not asked to sign) to accept the terms of the Quadruple Alliance. On 4 August 1720 a Savoyard viceroy, Filippo Guglielmo di Saint-Rémy, carried aboard a British ship, landed in Sardinia. A British officer had remarked to him that Sardinia was "hardly of any other advantage to the Prince that possesses it than giving him the title of king". It also gave him munitions, which the Savoyards had exhausted in Sicily during the suppression of brigandage and the defence against the Spanish. The Spanish had begun to remove their munitions from Sardinia, but were ultimately forced to pay an indemnity of 100,000 écus, even though Victor Amadeus demanded 150,000.

In September 1726 a British envoy, John Hedges, arrived in Turin to suggest, among other things, that Victor Amadeus be returned Sicily. Victor Amadeus was still asking for compensation for the loss of Sicily as late as November 1729.

== Bibliography ==
=== Works cited ===
- Geoffrey Symcox. Victor Amadeus II: Absolutism in the Savoyard State, 1675–1730. University of California Press, 1983.
- Christopher Storrs. War, Diplomacy and the Rise of Savoy, 1690–1720. Cambridge University Press: 1999.

=== Further reading ===
- Alfred Baraudon. La maison de Savoie et la triple alliance (1713–1722). Paris: 1896.
- Carlo Alberto Garufi (ed.). Rapporti diplomatici tra Filippo V e Vittorio Amedeo II di Savoia, nella cessione del regno di Sicilia ... 1712–1720. Palermo: 1914.
- Isidoro La Lumia. "La Sicilia sotto Vittorio Amedeo di Savoia". Archivo storico italiano, 3rd series, 19, 20, 21 (1874–75).
- L. La Rocca. "Una proposta di lega italiana al re di Sicilia nel 1719". Archivo storico siciliano, new series, 32 (1907).
- L. La Rocca. "Relazione al re Vittorio Amedeo II di Savoia sulle condizioni economiche, sociali e politiche della Sicilia alla fine del dominio spagnuolo". Archivio storico per la Sicilia orientale, 11 (1914).
- Giovanni Raffiotta. Gabelle e dogane a Palermo nel primo trentennio del '700. Palermo: 1962.
- Paolo Revelli. "Vittorio Amedeo II e le condizioni geografiche della Sicilia". Rivista geografica italiana, 27, 28 (1910–11).
- Luigi Riccobene. Sicilia ed Europa dal 1700 al 1735. Palermo: 1976.
- Giuseppe Spata (ed.). "I primi atti costituzionali dell'augusta Casa di Savoia ordinati in Palermo". Miscellanea di storia italian (Turin), 10 (1870).
- Vittorio Emanuele Stellardi (ed.). Il regno di Vittorio Amedeo II di Savoia in Sicilia dall'anno 1713 al 1719, 3 vols. Turin: 1862.
- A. Tallone. Vittorio Amedeo II e la quadruplice alleanza. Turin: 1914.
