= Kingdom of Sardinia (1700–1720) =

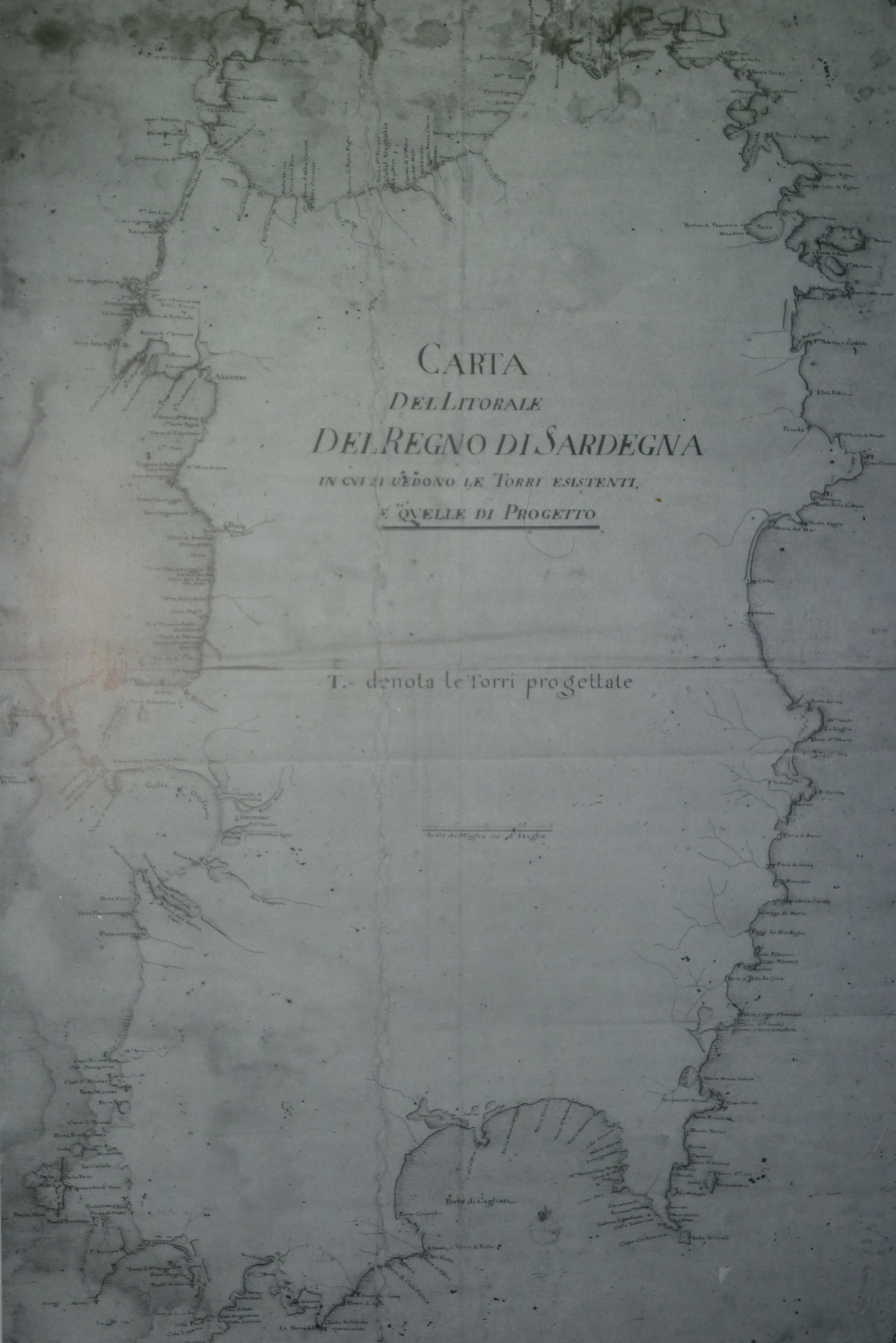
Map of the coast of Sardinia showing then-extant towers and those under construction or in planning in 1720, from the library of the University of Cagliari

From 1700 to 1720, the Kingdom of Sardinia, as a part of the Spanish Empire, was disputed between two dynasties, the Habsburgs and the Bourbons. With the death of Charles II, the last of the Spanish Habsburgs, on 1 November 1700, the throne passed to Duke Philip of Anjou (Philip V), although the Emperor Leopold I also had a claim. Leopold was especially desirous of obtaining the Spanish inheritance in the Southern Netherlands and in Italy, which included Sardinia. With the failure of France to abide by the Second Partition Treaty, the other European powers lined up on the side of the Habsburgs. The Treaty of the Hague (7 September 1701) allotted to the Emperor the Spanish possessions in Italy. Imperial troops invaded Italy to seize them, and the War of the Spanish Succession began.

The Spanish governors of Sardinia were initially loyal to the Bourbons, and a pro-Habsburg revolt was suppressed. In 1708, with the help of Britain's Mediterranean Fleet, the island was conquered for the Habsburgs. At the end of the war, a series of treaties—Utrecht (1713), Rastatt (1714) and Baden (1714)—transferred the Spanish-held kingdoms of Sardinia and Naples to the Habsburg emperor, now Charles VI. Although Charles believed he should also receive the Kingdom of Sicily, which had been in union with Naples since 1504, this was instead given to the House of Savoy.

Neither house possessed their island kingdom for long: Spain re-conquered Sardinia in 1717 and Sicily the next year. By the Treaty of the Hague (1720), Spain and the Empire recognised the re-allotment of Sicily to the Habsburgs and Sardinia to Savoy.

Through the entire period from 1700 until 1720 Sardinia remained formally attached to the Spanish crown. During the period when the Austrian Habsburgs controlled the island they administered it as part of a collection of former Spanish territories whose sovereignty they claimed as part of their pretense to the Spanish throne. Throughout the period, Sardinia was garrisoned by Spanish troops and governed by a Spanish viceroy, who were alternately loyal to one claimant or the other (with varying degrees of international recognition). At the end of this period it passed out of the Spanish sphere permanently.

== History ==
=== Bourbon rule (1700–08) ===
At the start of Philip V's reign, the viceroys of Sardinia were loyal to him. In 1706, two brothers, the Conde de Cifuentes and the Conde de Montesanto, led a revolt in favour of the Habsburg claimant, the Emperor's son, the Archduke Charles of Austria (the future Charles VI, who was called "Charles III" of Spain), who was widely supported by the natives of Gallura. A strong supporter of Philip V, Vicente Bacallar, who believed the Bourbon Louis XIV of France the ideal monarch, was governor of Gallura and Cagliari in the east of the island at the time. He suppressed the revolt, but the viceroy, the Marqués de Jamaica, ignored his advice to exile the ringleaders.

The first external action taken by supporters of "Charles III" involved a Royal Navy fleet of forty ships under John Leake landing Austrian troops at Terranova Pausania in 1708. The Austrians were to give support to Charles' partisans on the island, while the British fleet went on to Cagliari, the capital of Sardinia, where it anchored in the afternoon of August 11 or 12. The British fleet brought with it a force of 600 Marines and 1,000 Spanish troops loyal to Charles under the command of Major General Charles Wills. The British sent a letter to the Marqués de Jamaica ordering him to "render the town and kingdom of Sardinia to the obedience of King Charles", and another letter to the townspeople, "to assure them of their effects and ancient privileges, in case they made their said obedience".

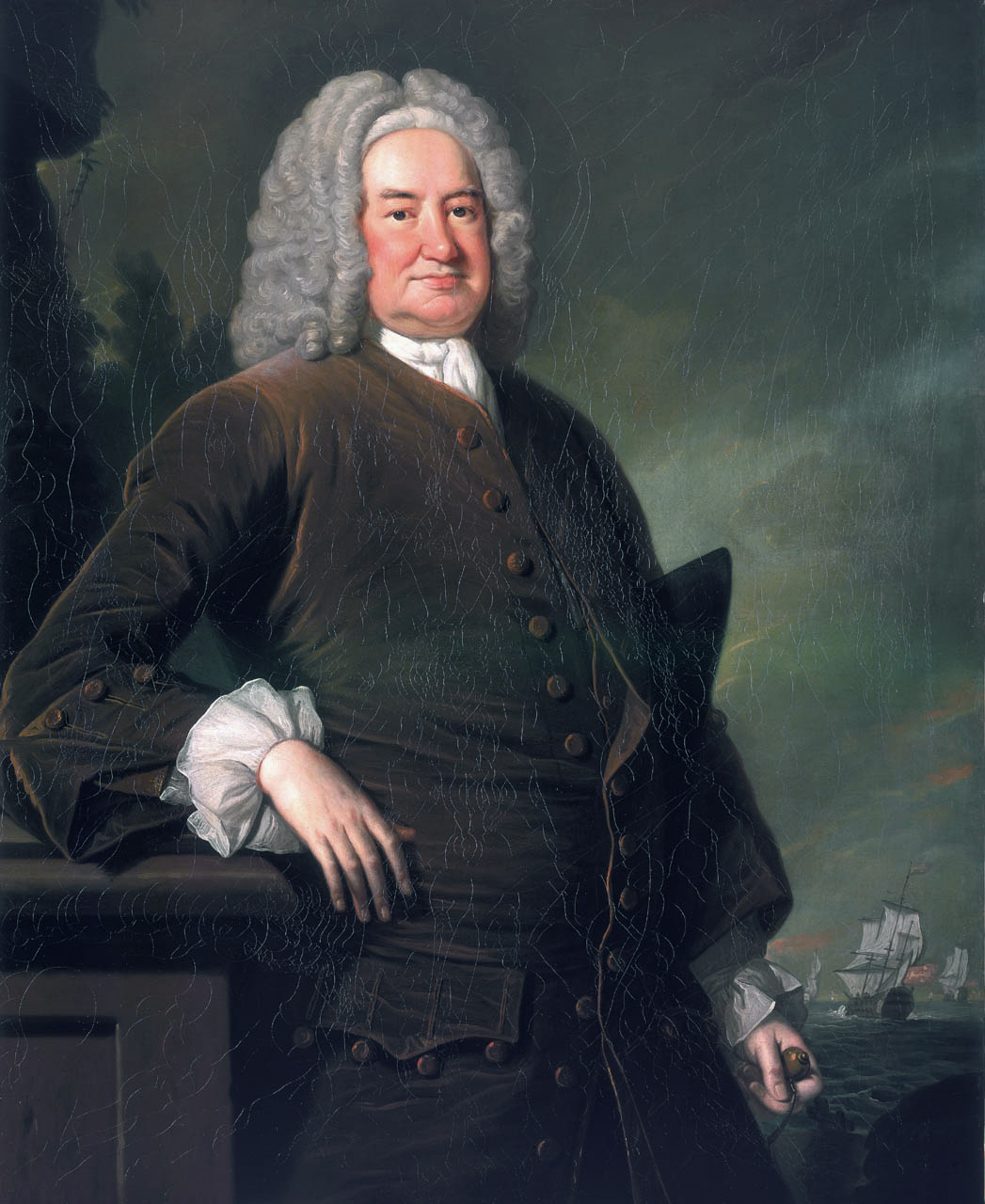
British admiral John Norris, who was present at the capitulation of Sardinia in 1708 and defended it from invasion in 1710

There are two different accounts of what happened next. According to one, the viceroy refused the surrender with the understanding that the British would, pro forma, lob a few shells on his city so that his men could claim to have fought. He then surrendered. According to another, of the eyewitness naval officer John Norris, the officer who delivered the ultimatum was to give the Marqués four hours to respond (i.e., until nightfall). When the viceroy tried to postpone a response until the morning by claiming that it was too late to assemble his government, the British " judged it best to keep on the fright and cause no delay", bombarding the city with 120 shells. At daylight Wills landed the men, including 900 sailors, to the east of the city, and Leake brought seven ships into harbour in order to cannonade the fortifications. Before he could do so, the viceroy, "having secured the honours of war", put up a white flag, "after which the mob took possession of the gates, and delivered them up to us". According to Norris, the city was "much stronger than Barcelona ... with 87 brass cannon mounted". The British under Leake had recently rescued Barcelona from a siege. In light of the ongoing campaign in Catalonia, the island shipped 1,400 tons of corn to Catalonia on August 13, either because the British requisitioned it, or the Sardinian parliament, the Stamenti, offered it.

=== Imperial rule (1708–17) ===
==== Military takeover ====
After the pro-Habsburg takeover, the Conde de Cifuentes (also Marqués de Alconzel), who had arrived with the British fleet, was installed as viceroy and captain-general, and the Spanish troops were left under his command while Wills and the British soldiers re-embarked. The fleet went off to capture Minorca. The new viceroy's first task was the subjugation of the entire island by the removal of pro-Bourbon partisans. He was assisted by his brother and by Francisco Pes, brother of the famous Galluran poet Gavino Pes, from Tempio. The leader of the Bourbonist partisans, Bacallar, fled into the Galluran mountains, where he was defeated by Pes.

In 1710, Vicente Bacallar, Marquis of San Felipe, approached both Philip V and Louis XIV in an effort to garner support for an invasion of Sardinia. Louis agreed to send 2,000 troops and ships, but the expedition was delayed several times. The commander Juan Francisco Pacheco, Duque de Uceda and Conde de Montalbán, passed on information to the British under Norris, who were prepared for the attempted landing at Terranova and Castelsardo in June. San Felipe was forced to retreat to Genoa. In July 1713, when Philip V floated the idea of an assault on Sardinia, recently transferred to the Emperor, the British, whose Mediterranean Fleet dominated the sea, quashed the idea and upheld the neutrality of Italy.

==== Administration ====
On 29 December 1713, Charles formed the Supreme Council of Spain (Consejo Supremo de España) in Vienna to govern those domains he still retained of the former Spanish empire. As part of this arrangement, Sardinia received its own councillor (consejero de capa y espada) and two regents, who would derive their salary from the island's income (other Spanish states' councillors were given a salary by the central government). The persons appointed to these positions were generally exiled Spaniards. José de Silva y Meneses, Marqués de Villasor and Conde de Montesanto, was the first councillor for Sardinia. The first regents were Domingo, Conde de Aguirre, a Valencian, and Juan Bautista, Marqués de Cuggía.

On 8 March 1714, Charles formed a department of internal affairs (negociación) for each of the former Spanish realms—Sardinia, Naples, Milan and the Southern Netherlands—within the Habsburg Council of State for Spain. Each department was led by a secretary assisted by several officials. For the kingdom of Sardinia the first secretary was Francisco Ibáñez de Aoyz, of Aragon, assisted by four officials: José Gutiérrez de Lara, from Madrid; Felipe Gallart, a Catalan; Bartolomé Quadrado, a Castilian; and Luciano Ortiz, an Aragonese. The Sardinian secretary made less than those of the other realms, only 6,000 florins a year. Ibáñez de Aoyz was replaced in 1716 by Francisco Verneda. During the last brief period of Habsburg rule on the island, the royal patrimony of Sardinia provided 20,000 escudos annually, which went to the military fund (caxa militar).

=== Spanish re-conquest (1717–20) ===
In July 1717 Austria was in the midst of a military intervention in the Second Morean War, allied with Venice against the Ottoman Empire. With the aid of the indulto—a tithe on church revenues—permitted by Pope Clement XI to aid against the Ottomans, the king of Spain and his prime minister, Giulio Alberoni, had prepared a fleet of six ships-of-the-line and eight galleys, with 8,000 soldiers, in the harbour of Barcelona to go east and assist the Austro-Venetian alliance. Although rumours had it that Philip V planned to attack Habsburg Italy, the king officially denied them and even made a promise to the pope that he would not make war on the Emperor while the war with the Ottomans was ongoing.

After awaiting favorable winds at Majorca, the Spanish fleet under the Marquis de Lede sailed to Cagliari, where it arrived on 25 July. The island's major centres, such as Sassari and Alghero, fell within two months, and the whole island was under Spanish control by November. On 27 December, Charles was forced to acknowledge the loss of Sardinia, its revenues and the jobs of those employed in its bureaucracy. The Sardinian secretary and officials took over some of the work load of the Neapolitan secretariate.

Alberoni ordered the Marquis de Lede to recruit Sards for an army with which to invade Sicily. The Sicilian expedition failed, and Spain in the ensuing negotiations gave up its claim on Sardinia and recognised Austria's right in the Treaty of the Hague. Some of the men formerly employed in the Sardinian department at the Council of State—such as José Gutiérrez and Luciano Ortiz—now found themselves working in the Sicilian department.

In the Treaty of The Hague, the Emperor and Victor Amadeus II of Sardinia agreed to exchange Sicily and Sardinia. On 8 August 1720, Philip V's viceroy handed Sardinia over to an Austrian representative, who in turn transferred it to the viceroy of Victor Amadeus.

== List of viceroys (1700–20) ==
Under Philip V

- Fernando de Moncada Aragón la Cerda y Gaetano, Duke of San Juan (1699–1703)
- Francisco Ginés Ruiz de Castro, Count of Lemos (1703–1704)
- Baltasar de Zúñiga y Guzmán, Marquis of Valero (1704–1706)
- Pedro Manuel Colón de Portugal, Duke of Veragua (1706–1709)

Under Charles III

- Fernando de Silva y Meneses, Count of Cifuentes (1709–1710)
- Jorge de Heredia, Count of Fuentes (1710–1711)
- Andrés Roger de Eril, Count of Eril (1711–1713)
- Pedro Manuel, Count of Ayala (1713–1717)
- José Antonio de Rubí y Boxadors, Marquis of Rubí (1717)

Under Philip V

- Jean François de Bette, Marquis of Lede (1717–1718)
- Gonzalo Chacón de Orellana (1718–1720)

== See also ==
- French–Habsburg rivalry

== Bibliography ==
- Frey, Linda and Marsha Frey. The Treaties of the War of the Spanish Succession: An Historical and Critical Dictionary. Westport, CT: Greenwood Press, 1995.
- León Sanz, Virginia. "Origen del Consejo Supremo de España en Viena", Hispania, 52:180 (1992), 107–42.
- Mattone, A. "La cessione del Regno di Sardegna dal Trattato di Utrecht alla presa di possesso Sabauda (1713–1720)", Rivista storico italiana, 104 (1991), 5ff.
- McKay, Derek. "Bolingbroke, Oxford and the Defence of the Utrecht Settlement in Southern Europe". The English Historical Review,. 86:339 (1971), 264–84.
- Parnell, Arthur. The War of the Succession in Spain: During the Reign of Queen Anne, 1702–1711. London: George Bell and Sons, 1888.
- Setton, K. M. Venice, Austria, and the Turks in the Seventeenth Century. Philadelphia: American Philosophical Society, 1991.
- Smyth, W. H. Sketch of the Present State of the Island of Sardinia. London: John Murray, 1828. Online
- Storrs, Christopher (1999). War, Diplomacy and the Rise of Savoy, 1690–1720. Cambridge University Press. ISBN 978-0-521-55146-5.
