= Spanish invasion of Sicily (1718–1720) =

- Part of the War of the Quadruple Alliance
- Map of the first siege of Messina (1718)
Date	1718–1720
Location	Sicily
Result	Quadruple Alliance victory: Sicily ceded to Charles VI

Belligerents
Spain	Sicily; Great Britain; Holy Roman Empire

Commanders and leaders
Marquis of Lede	Annibale Maffei

Strength
30,000	8,000 garrison; 6,000 reinforcements

Casualties and losses
	6,000+ (1719)

The Spanish invasion of Sicily in 1718, sometimes called the Sicily Crisis, was the inciting event of the War of the Quadruple Alliance. The invaders conquered most of the island save Milazzo before a counter-invasion by forces of Charles VI, Holy Roman Emperor, pushed them back. They still held Palermo when the war ended in 1720.

== Background ==
By the Treaty of Utrecht of 1713 ending the War of the Spanish Succession, Spain ceded the Kingdom of Sicily to Savoy and the Kingdom of Sardinia to Charles VI. The treaty also confirmed King Philip V of Spain as lord of the lands and fiefs he had confiscated in Sicily from the Almirante de Castilla during the war.

In 1717, Philip V launched an invasion of Sardinia in violation of the Treaty of Utrecht. He had not secured an alliance with any other power and his invasion was a violation of his guarantee not to harm Charles VI while the latter was at war with the Ottomans. Suspecting that Sicily was next, five powers—Great Britain, France, the Dutch Republic, Sicily and the Holy Roman Empire—warned Philip not to proceed.

Philip justified his plans by accusing of Charles VI of planning to seize the island for himself, while Philip merely intended to prevent this, without prejudice to the rights of the Savoyard king. He wrote to his ambassador in Sicily, the Marqués de Villamayor, that he was "duty bound to resist such an extraordinary design and one so harmful to Europe". Since Sicily had not been conquered in the War of the Spanish Succession, Philip considered its loss a product of extortion. The former lands of the Almirante de Castilla, amounting to about 10% of the island, constituted "a state within a state", whose lords were loyal to Philip rather than their king.

== Sicilian defences ==
Soon after the invasion of Sardinia, the Savoyard viceroy, Annibale Maffei, began planning Sicily's defence, which was based on the coastal cities of Palermo, Milazzo, Messina, Augusta, Syracuse and Trapani and the outlying island of Lipari. The interior was basically undefended. The most modern fortifications were those of Messina, constructed in the 1690s by Carlos de Grunenbergh.

King Victor Amadeus II of Sicily ordered Maffei to focus his defence on Messina, Milazzo and Trapani. Palermo's garrison was reduced from 3,000 to 700 soldiers, since it was considered unable to withstand a siege and its population unreliable and pro-Spanish. There 1,200 soldiers each in Messina, Milazzo, Syracuse and Trapani, a further 600 assigned to Termini, 700 in Augusta and 700 reserves. These 8,000 or so soldiers were theoretically augmented by the feudal levies that could be raised by the Sicilian baronage, but as the barons were largely Spanish sympathisers these were not used. The plan was to defend only those cities—all in the east of the island—with walls capable of withstanding sieges, while keeping communications with the Kingdom of Naples open and a port available for the British, who were allied with Savoy. The Sicilian fleet consisted of a few galleys. The only hope for a successful defence was British intervention.

== Invasion ==
=== Spain vs Savoy and Britain ===
The Spanish invasion fleet assembled in Barcelona at the end of May 1718. Two weeks later, Victor Amadeus wrote to King George I of Great Britain that the fleet had left Barcelona for Palermo. The fleet contained 29 warships and 250 transports and other auxiliary vessels with a total of 10,110 sailors. A Spanish army of 30,000 soldiers was landed at Palermo in July under the guns of the fleet. It was commanded by the Marquis of Lede, who had planned the expedition. It included a newly created corps of enginners under Jorge Próspero de Verboom.

The city of Palermo fell quickly, the viceroy and the garrison fleeing while a small force was left in command of Castello a Mare. The population greeted the Spanish as liberators and troops were raised for the Spanish army on the former lands of the Almirante de Castilla. The Conde de Montemar urged an attack on Milazzo, but Lede left him in charge of Palermo and marched the greater part of the army towards Messina. While city itself surrendered before the Spanish arrive, the main fortification, the Real Cittadella, defended by 6,000 soldiers, resisted and was besieged. At the same time, the cities of Trapani, Milazzo and Augusta were blockaded by land. Taormina surrendered to Lede, while Montemar captured Termini. Augusta was soon abandoned to shore up the defence of the Cittadella.

The siege of the Real Cittadella lasted three months. In late July, Britain, France, the Dutch Republic and the Empire signed the treaty creating the Quardruple Alliance, directed against Spain. The Spanish fleet, which had captured a few Sicilian vessels, was defeated by the British in the Battle of Cape Passaro on 11 August. The Spanish lost all vessels with 2,400 killed and 3,000 captured. In response, Spain declared war on Britain, formally beginning the War of the Quardruple Alliance. The Cittadella capitulated a few weeks later. With no means of retreating from the island, Lede adjusted his strategy to preserve his strength, focussing on blockades without serious fighting.

=== Imperial intervention ===
Map of the siege of Milazzo in 1718

Charles VI landed a force of 6,000 Austrians to assist the defence of the island. Shortly after the start of the blockade of Milazzo in October, a sally by the Austrians resulted in the Battle of Milazzo. The Spanish were victorious, with both sides losing about 1,500 men. In November, Charles VI and Victor Amadeus II agreed to exchange Sardinia and Sicily after the war. The blockade of Milazzo lasted a further seven months.

A contemporary Italian observer wrote that the Capo di Milazzo "was not for the Imperials a camp but a cemetery", calling its defenders after Charles VI. Milazzo, however, could not be blockaded by sea. In June 1719, an imperial army landed and was defeated in the Battle of Francavilla. The Spanish, however, were unable to take the initiative. The imperial army laid siege to Messina.

The second siege of the Real Cittadella of Messina was the bloodiest action of the war. The besiegers lost between 6,000 and 9,000 troops. Lede did not intervene to help the defenders, for which he was roundly criticized by his subordinates, particularly Verboom. Messina fell in October 1719. Thereafter, Lede gradually retreated as the imperial army advanced. Taormina and Augusta submitted without resistance. Lede unsuccessfully sought a truce. The armies were in the vicinity of Palermo when, in May 1720, the Treaty of The Hague came into effect, ending the war without another pitched battle. The Spanish forces were evacuated later that year after negotiations with the victorious powers. Many Sicilians loyal to the Spanish went into exile with them.

== Sources ==
In 1755, the Marqués de la Mina, who took part in the invasion, published Memorias Militares sobre la guerra de Cerdeña y Sicilia en los años de 1717 a 1720, which is a major source for the campaign.

Owen Pikkert has studied the role of the British press in creating a sense of crisis in Britain over the Spanish invasion.
