= Spanish War =

The Spanish War may refer to:

- Any one of the Anglo-Spanish Wars
- Any one of the Franco-Spanish Wars
- War of the Spanish Succession, a war fought among several European powers against the Kingdoms of France, Spain, and the Electorate of Bavaria.
- Spanish–American War, an armed military conflict between Spain and the United States that took place between April and August 1898, over the issues of the liberation of Cuba.
- Spanish Civil War, a major conflict that devastated Spain from 17 July 1936 to 1 April 1939.
