= Stamenti =

Former parliament of Sardinia

The Stamenti (Spanish: Estamentos; Catalan: Estaments; Sardinian: Istamentos / Stamentus) was the parliament of Sardinia, consisting of representatives of the three estates of the realm.

The term "Stamenti" is the plural of "Stamento" and they are both forms which, under Savoyard rule, were Italianized from the original Spanish word "Estamento", which referred to an estate of the realm. The Sardinian parliament was divided into three traditional estates: the first or ecclesiastical estate, (Note: Catalan braç eclesiàstic, Italian stamento/braccio ecclesiastico) the second or baronial estate, (Note: braç militar, stamento/braccio militare) and the third or royal cities estate. (Note: braç reial, stamento/braccio reale) The single estates were called braços and later bracci, meaning "arms". It had the power to authorise taxation, although its powers were executed by a commission of deputies after 1721 and it was abolished via the "Perfect Fusion" of the Savoyard States in 1847, replaced by the Parliament of the Kingdom of Sardinia.

== Aragonese era ==
In 1355 Peter IV called a parliament of the Sardinian nobility in order to address the resistance to his rule of Judge Marianus IV of Arborea, but the greater nobles refused to attend. This was nevertheless the first Sardinian parliament. One of its acts was to exclude all those of non-noble birth from entering the nobility (heretats). Its role was formalised in the constitution promulgated by Alfonso V in 1421, after which it was convened (semi-)regularly every ten years. Many members of the Sardinian parliament visited the Corts of Catalonia and were familiar with its functioning. The Corts in turn seems to have regarded Sardinia as lying within its jurisdiction, for in 1366 it petition Peter IV to revoke the law of exclusion passed in 1355. The king refused on the grounds that it was not right for laws passed by the parliament of one kingdom to be revoked by the parliament of another. This was relevant to Peter's other dispute with the Catalans, who wished to be exempted from the Sardinian customs regime. So long as Catalans were residents of the island they were subject to its parliament's laws. In 1421, in imitation of the Corts, the Estaments demanded the redress of grievances before voting on taxes. Establishing the priority of the former greatly augmented a parliament's power. When the taxes were approved, the Estaments established a committee of three, one from each estate, to oversee their collection.

In 1446, the Estaments, or perhaps just the baronial estate, petitioned Alfonso V for the right to assemble without royal permission. Alfonso, who probably saw no threat in it, granted the petition. The king was proved right, since the Estaments never assembled on their own initiative. In 1420, Alfonso convened a meeting at Bonifacio of representatives of the baronage, the church and the cities of Corsica, but this institution did not develop and Aragonese control of Corsica—together with Sardinia forming the regnum Sardiniae et Corsicae—soon waned.

Shortly after his accession, Ferdinand II had his viceroy, Ximene Pérez Scrivá, summon parliament to Oristano (November 1481), the site of a recent rebellion. The parliament was later moved to Cagliari and then Sassari. The purpose of this assembly was to raise monies—Pérez requested a permanent annual tax rate of one ducat per household—for the island's defence from the Ottoman Turks, who had captured Otranto the year before. The weakness of the Sardinian parliament was displayed in these events. Pérez was removed because of a dispute with the citizens of Cagliari, and the reinstated a short time later, after the intervening viceroy had died. The parliament did not protest, nor did it protest when Ferdinand summoned it to Spain, where it met in Seville and Córdoba in the fall of 1484. The Sardinian elite, mostly descended from Catalans, maintained strong ties with Spain. The final procès-verbal of the meeting in Seville on 27 October declared that the "decrees, provisions, commissions and other acts granted by His Majesty to the estates of said kingdom ... will remain in suspension and suspended until the grants of money of the said estates are published by His Majesty in the said kingdom of Sardinia." An exaction of 150,000 lire was approved, to be collected over ten years. Had the original proposal been passed, the government would have had no need to summon the parliament again. In fact, it was summoned in 1494 when the 150,000 lire were spent. From 1497 to 1511 the Estaments conducting business in a series of distinct sessions, making for a parliament of unprecedented length.

== Spanish era ==
In the sixteenth century, the Estamentos stagnated. It was regularly called every nine or ten years to approve taxes, but as the costs of Spain's foreign wars rose in the early seventeenth century it became increasingly reluctant to grant the king's proposed expropriations. In 1624–25 there was strong resistance from the Estamentos to the king's request for money to pay for the ongoing Thirty Years' War, resistance which was also met around the same time in the Parliament of England and the Corts of Catalonia. At the time, the viceroy, Juan Vivas, had the support of the town of Sassari and the nobles who were usually resident in Spain, while he was opposed by the town of Cagliari (a traditional rival of Sassari) and by the rest of the noble and ecclesiastical estates. At one point Vivas quartered Lombard soldiers in his opponents' houses to break their opposition, but for the most part each side merely delivered grievances to the Council of Aragon in Spain.

In 1654–55 another conflict between viceroy and parliament broke out, this time accompanied by rioting and unrest. It was exceeded by the conflict of 1665–68, in which both the leader of the noble opposition, Augustín de Castellví, and the viceroy, Manuel de los Cobos were assassinated. The parliament—or at least the faction led by the local nobility—disputed the king's right to appoint Spaniards to public office in Sardinia, defended noble jurisdiction against royal encroachment, asserted the right of cities to export grain without first storing it in government granaries and demanded that the king confirm all the acts previously passed by parliament. In the end, the crown won and the leaders of the opposition were executed and their heads displayed on the towers of Cagliari.

The last time the Estamentos were convened under Spanish rule was in 1697, by Charles II. This session lasted until 1699. It was the only time that the parliament reduced the king's sum before passing it.

== Savoyard era ==
During the tumultuous period from 1700 to 1720, which include the War of the Spanish Succession (1701–14) and of the Quadruple Alliance (1718–20), the Stamenti was not convened at all. Its continued existence was assured, however, by the terms of the cession of the kingdom to Savoy by Spain. In August 1720, Saint-Rémy, the viceroy of the new king, Victor Amadeus II, called a meeting of the Stamenti to swear fealty to Victor Amadeus and approve taxes. Early in 1721 it was called upon again to approve emergency taxes to deal with an epidemic of bubonic plague. This was the last time the Stamenti met. Thereafter only its commission of deputies was asked to re-authorise the previously approved taxes, which it duly did every three years. This brought Sardinia in line with the other possessions of the House of Savoy, save the Duchy of Aosta, the last one where parliamentary approval was still required for raising money.

== Bibliography ==
- Hillgarth, Jocelyn N. The Spanish Kingdoms, 1250–1516, vol. 1. Oxford: Clarendon Press, 1976.
- Koenigsberger, Helmut Georg. "The Italian Parliaments from their Origins to the End of the 18th Century". Politicians and Virtuosi: Essays on Early Modern History (London: The Hambledon Press, 1986), 27–62. Originally published in The Journal of Italian History 1, 1 (1978), 18–49.
- Russell, Conrad S. R. "Monarchies, Wars, and Estates in England, France, and Spain, c. 1580 – c. 1640". Legislative Studies Quarterly 7, 2 (1982), 205–20.
- Storrs, Christopher. War, Diplomacy and the Rise of Savoy, 1690–1720. Port Chester, NY: Cambridge University Press, 2000.
- Symcox, Geoffrey. Victor Amadeus II: Absolutism in the Savoyard State, 1675–1730 Berkeley: University of California Press, 1983.
