= Siege of Messina =

Siege of Messina may refer to:

- Siege of Messina (842–843), by an Arab army
- Siege of Messina (1190), by Richard I of England
- Siege of Messina (1282), by Angevin Naples
- Siege of Messina (1301), by an Aragonese-Angevin force
- Siege of Messina (1718), by Bourbon Spain during the Spanish invasion of Sicily (1718–1720)
- Siege of Messina (1719), by Habsburg Monarchy during the Spanish invasion of Sicily (1718–1720)
- Siege of Messina (1848), by the Kingdom of Two Sicilies
