= Conquest of Sardinia =

Conquest of Sardinia may refer to:

- Aragonese conquest of Sardinia
- Spanish conquest of Sardinia
