= Wirich Philipp von Daun =

Austrian field marshal (1668–1741)

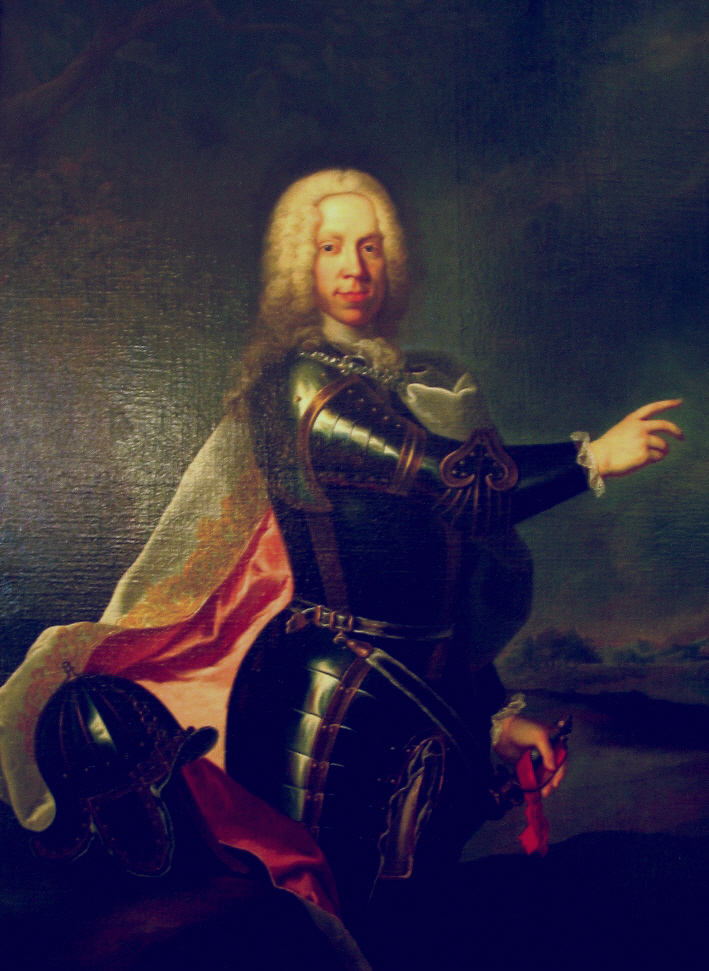
Count Wirich Philipp von Daun

Count Wirich Philipp von Daun (19 October 1668 – 30 July 1741) was an Austrian Field Marshal of the Imperial Army in the War of Spanish Succession, and father of the better known Leopold Josef Graf Daun. In 1710 he was created Prince of Teano.

== Biography ==
Daun was born in Vienna, the son of Count Wilhelm Johann Anton von und zu Daun (1621–1706), who served as Field Marshal, and his second wife, Countess Anna Maria Magdalene von Althann (1635–1712). He served in the War of Spanish Succession under Eugene of Savoy, and gained his fame in the successful defence of Turin in 1706. He also laid siege to and conquered Gaeta on 30 September 1707.

After the war, in 1713 Daun became the first Austrian Viceroy of Naples. In 1718 he lost the Battle of Milazzo during the War of the Quadruple Alliance, when Spain invaded neighbouring Sicily.

From February until October 1725 Daun was interim Governor of the Habsburg Netherlands. He was to prepare for the arrival of the new governor, Archduchess Maria Elisabeth of Austria, sister of the Emperor Charles VI. The situation in the Austrian Netherlands was very difficult after the mismanagement by the previous plenipotentiary minister Hercule-Louis Turinetti, marquis of Prié. Daun profited from the positive atmosphere resulting from the departure of Prié. He enforced a reform of the military organisation and administration in the Southern Netherlands, in which he incorporated the existing 'Belgian' army into the imperial forces.

From 1725 until 1736 he was Governor of Milan.

Daun died at Vienna and was buried in the Georgskapelle of the Augustinerkirche, together with his son.

== Notes ==
Preceded by Prince Eugene of Savoy; Hercule-Louis Turinetti, marquis of Prié	Governor of the Austrian Netherlands; 1725	Succeeded by Archduchess Maria Elisabeth of Austria (1680–1741)
