= José Carrillo de Albornoz, 1st Duke of Montemar =

Spanish nobleman and military leader (1671–1747)

The Most Excellent The Duke of Montemar
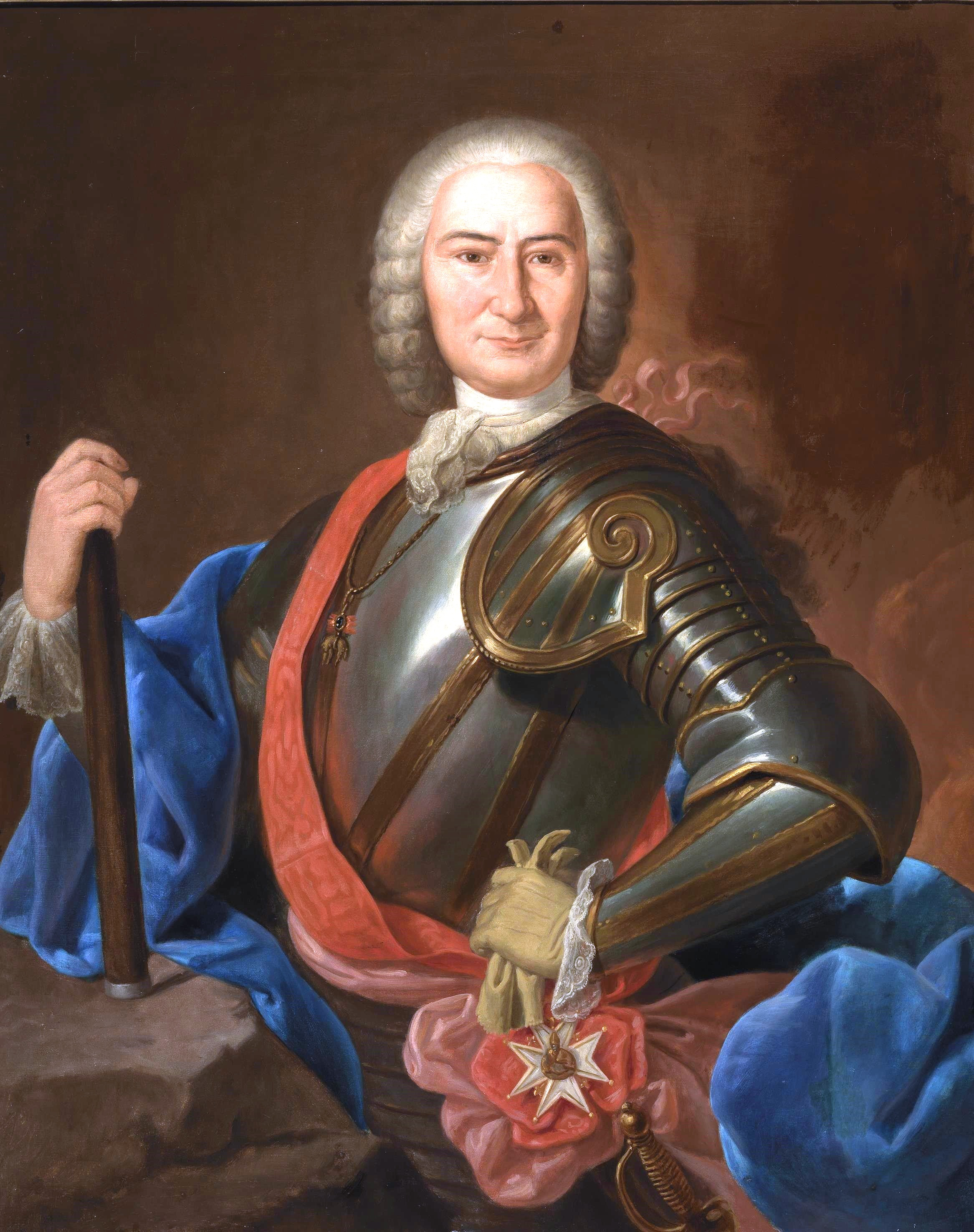
- Oil portrait by Joaquín Serrano, Prado museum.

Viceroy of Sicily
- In office 1734–1737
- Monarch: Charles III
- Preceded by: Cristoforo Fernández de Cordoba, Count of Sastago, 1728–1734, under Austrian rule
- Succeeded by: Bartolomeo Corsini, Prince of Gismano, 1737–1747

Secretary of State for War of Spain
- In office 18 March 1737 – 27 October 1741
- Monarch: Philip V
- First Secretary of State: Marquess of Villarías
- Preceded by: Marquess of Villarías (as interim)
- Succeeded by: Marquess of Villarías

Personal details
- Born: 8 October 1671 Seville, Spain
- Died: 26 June 1747 (aged 75) Madrid, Spain
- Spouse: Isabel Francisca de Antich y Antich
- Children: Francisco Carrillo de Albornoz y Antich, Leonor Carrillo de Albornoz y Antich and María Magdalena Carrillo de Albornoz y Antich

José Carrillo de Albornoz y Montiel, 1st Duke of Montemar (8 October 1671 – 26 June 1747) was a Spanish Army officer and nobleman who served as the viceroy of Sicily from 1734 to 1737. He was one of the leading military men in the early Bourbon Spain, achieving the reconquests of Parma, Oran and Naples for the crown of Spain during his career.

== Biography ==
Carrillo was born in Seville. He was a member of the Carrillo family, one of the oldest Spanish noble houses. He married Isabel Francisca de Antich y Antich in 1700 with whom he had three children (Francisco, Leonor & María Magdalena). He served in the Spanish marine infantry in 1690 before joining the tercio of Jerónimo Martín in 1694.

During the War of the Spanish Succession he aligned with the side of Philip of Anjou and fought as mariscal de campo in the Battle of Villaviciosa (1710) in the cavalry under the Count of Aguilar. He also participated in the Spanish campaigns to conquer Sardinia and Sicily during the War of the Quadruple Alliance between 1718 and 1720.

In 1731 he headed the expeditionary force that occupied the Duchy of Parma for its legal heir, Don Carlos, future King Charles III of Spain. In 1732 Blas de Lezo led the Spanish navy and Montemar the Spanish army in retaking Oran and Mazalquivir from the Turks (which had taken both cities in 1708.

The following year he commanded the Spanish army that fought and defeated the Austrians in Italy during the War of Polish Succession. His greatest victory was the Battle of Bitonto on 25 May 1734, which sealed Spanish control of Naples. For this victory, the king Philip V of Spain ennobled him as the first Duke of Montemar. He was the first viceroy of Sicily after the Spanish reconquest of the island from 1734 to 1737 and Minister of War from 1737 to 1741.

In 1741 he was appointed as head of the 50,000 men strong expeditionary Spanish army in Italy during the War of Austrian Succession. However, finding the crown had neglected the state of the army and altered completely his strategy plan, he refused to initiate offensive actions, which caused him to fall out of favor in the court. He was replaced at the end of 1742 by Jean Thierry du Mont, comte de Gages.

Government offices
Preceded by Cristobal Fernández de Cordoba, Count of Sastago, (1728–1734), under Austrian rule	Viceroy of Sicily; 1734–1737	Succeeded by Bartolomeo Corsini, Prince of Gismano, 1737–1747
Spanish nobility
New title	Duke of Montemar; 1735–1747	Succeeded by María Magdalena; Carrillo de Albornoz
Preceded by Francisco; Carrillo de Albornoz	Count of Montemar; 1700–1747	Succeeded by Diego; Carrillo de Albornoz
