= Count Claude Florimond de Mercy =

Austrian field marshal (1666–1734)

Claudius Florimund de Mercy
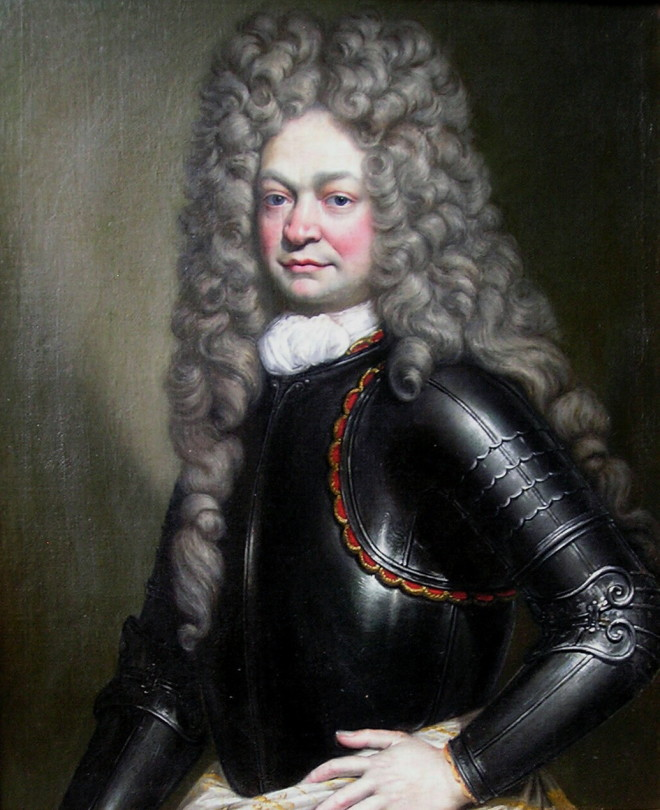
- Anonymous contemporary portrait
- Born: 1666; Longwy, Duchy of Lorraine
- Died: 29 June 1734 (aged 67–68); Parma, Duchy of Parma
- Military career
- Allegiance: Holy Roman Empire
- Branch: Imperial Army
- Service years: 1682–1734
- Rank: Generalfeldmarschall
- Conflicts: Great Turkish War; Battle of Vienna; Battle of Zenta; War of the Spanish Succession; Battle of Cremona; Battle of Friedlingen; Battle of Schellenberg; Austro-Turkish War; Battle of Peterwardein; Siege of Belgrade; War of the Quadruple Alliance; Battle of Francavilla; War of the Polish Succession; Battle of Parma

Count Claudius Florimund de Mercy (1666 – 29 June 1734) was an Imperial field marshal, born at Longwy in Lorraine, now in France. His grandfather was the Bavarian field marshal Franz Freiherr von Mercy.

Mercy entered the Austrian army as a volunteer in 1682. He won his commission at the great Battle of Vienna in the following year; and during seven years of campaigning in Hungary rose to the rank of Rittmeister. A wound sustained at this time permanently injured his sight. For five years more, up to 1697, he was employed in the Italian campaigns, then he was called back to Hungary by Prince Eugene of Savoy and won on the field of the Battle of Zenta two grades of promotion.

De Mercy displayed great daring in the first campaigns of the Spanish Succession War in Italy, twice fell into the hands of the enemy in rights at close quarters and for his conduct at the surprise of Cremona (31 January 1702) received the thanks of Leopold I, Holy Roman Emperor and the proprietary colonelcy of a newly raised cuirassier regiment. With this he took part in the Rhine campaign of 1703, and the Battle of Friedlingen, and his success as an intrepid leader of raids and forays became well known to friend and foe. He was on that account selected early in 1704 to harry the dominions of Maximilian II Emanuel, Elector of Bavaria. He was soon afterwards promoted to Generalfeldwachtmeister, in which rank he was engaged in the Battle of Schellenberg (2 July 1704).

In the rest of the war he was often distinguished by his fiery courage. He rose to be general of the cavalry in the course of these ten years. His resolute leadership was conspicuous at the Battle of Peterwardein (1716) and he was soon afterwards made commander of the Banat of Temesvár.

At the great Battle of Belgrade (1717) he led the second line of left wing cavalry in a brilliant and decisive charge which drove the forces of the Ottoman Empire to their trenches. After the peace he resumed the administration of the Banat, which after more than 150 years of Turkish rule needed a capable governor. But before his work was done he was once more called away to a command in the field, this time in southern Italy, where he fought the Battle of Francavilla (20 June 1719), took Messina and besieged Palermo. For eleven years more he administered the Banat, reorganizing the country as a prosperous and civilized community.

In 1733 he was made a general field marshal in the army and in the Spring of that year he and the Irish-born Major General Baron Francis Patrick O'Neillan assembled 50,000 men at Mantua in an effort to reclaim all that had been lost the previous year when the Austrians had been driven from Italy by the Franco-Spanish forces.

Mercy was killed on 29 June 1734 at the Battle of Parma while personally leading his troops. He left no children, and his name passed to Count Argenteau, from whom came the family of Mercy-Argenteau. He was the foster father of Florimund Count de Mercy d'Argenteau.

On 3 August 2009, a bust of the count was unveiled in Central Park, Timișoara.
