= Battle of Milazzo (1718) =

1718 battle between Spain and Austria, during the War of the Quadruple Alliance

- Part of the War of the Quadruple Alliance
Date	15 October 1718
Location	Milazzo, Sicily
Result	Spanish victory

Belligerents
Holy Roman Empire	(Spain) Spanish Empire

Commanders and leaders
Count Wirich Philipp von Daun	Marquis of Lede

Strength
6,000	9,300

Casualties and losses
1,500 killed or wounded 300 prisoners	1,500 killed or wounded 200 prisoners

The Battle of Milazzo was fought on 15 October 1718 near the city of Milazzo in Sicily between Spain and Austria as part of the War of the Quadruple Alliance.

== Background ==
Frustrated by the loss of his Italian possessions after the War of the Spanish Succession, King Philip V of Spain had invaded Sardinia, now in Austrian possession in August 1717 and invaded Sicily, which had been awarded to the Duke of Savoy, in July 1718.

He was taking advantage of the power vacuum in France after the death of Louis XIV, and the fact that Austria was tied up in the Austro-Turkish War of 1716–18. But on 21 July 1718 the Treaty of Passarowitz ended the war with Turkey and on 2 August this led to the formation of the Quadruple Alliance against Spain, between Austria, Britain, the Dutch Republic, and France.

Meanwhile, the Spanish, with 30,000 men under command of the Marquis of Lede, had taken the whole island, with the exception of the area around Messina, which was besieged since 18 July.

On 11 August, at the Battle of Cape Passaro, a British fleet, led by Sir George Byng, attacked and destroyed the Spanish fleet. On 13 October this British fleet landed an Austrian army, assembled in Naples by the Austrian Viceroy Count Wirich Philipp von Daun near Milazzo, to lift the siege by the Spanish forces. This led to the battle on 15 October.

== Battle ==
The Austrians attacked very early in the morning, taking the Spanish by surprise. The two Spanish Dragoon regiments (Batavia and Lusitania) stopped the attack, to give the rest of the Spanish army time to deploy. Both regiments were decimated, but their sacrifice gave Lede the opportunity to counterattack. The Austrians were pushed back and the Spanish pursued the fleeing army, causing many casualties.

The Austrians lost 1,500 killed or wounded and 300 prisoners. The Spanish lost 1,500 killed or wounded and 200 prisoners. Messina was taken by the Spanish, but the Marquis de Lede didn't take to opportunity to drive the Austrians completely from the island, leaving them a bridgehead around Milazzo. This bridgehead and naval supremacy after the Battle of Cape Passaro, gave the Austrians a chance to send over more troops the next year, leading to the Battle of Francavilla.

== Bibliography ==
- Chandler, David G. The Art of Warfare in the Age of Marlborough. Spellmount Limited, (1990). ISBN 0-946771-42-1
- BATALLA DE MELAZZO (15 de octubre de 1718)
