= Franco-Spanish War =

Franco-Spanish War may refer to any war between France and Spain, including:

Name	Date
Albigensian Crusade	1209–1229
War of the Sicilian Vespers	1282–1302
Aragonese Crusade	1284–1285
Castilian Civil War	1351–1369
War of the Two Peters	1356–1375
War of the Castilian Succession	1475–1479
French–Breton War	1487–1491
Italian War of 1494–98	1494–1498
Italian War of 1499–1504	1499–1504
War of the Holy League	1508–1516
Italian War of 1521–26	1521–1526
War of the League of Cognac	1526–1530
Italian War of 1536–38	1536–1538
Italian War of 1542–46	1542–1546
Italian War of 1551–59	1551–1559
French Wars of Religion	1562–1598
War of the Portuguese Succession	1580–1583
Franco-Spanish War (1595–98)	1595–1598
War of the Montferrat Succession	1613-1617
Bündner Wirren	1618–1639
Valtellina War	1620–1626
First Genoese-Savoyard War	1625
War of the Mantuan Succession	1628–1631
Franco-Spanish War (1635–59)	1635–1659
Catalan Revolt	1640–1659
Portuguese Restoration War	1641–1659
The Fronde	1648–1653
War of Devolution	1667–1668
Franco-Dutch War	1672–1678
War of the Reunions	1683–1684
Nine Years' War	1688–1697
War of the Spanish Succession	1701–1715
War of the Quadruple Alliance	1718–1720
War of the Pyrenees	1793–1795
Peninsular War	1808–1814
War of the Seventh Coalition	1815
Hundred Thousand Sons of Saint Louis	1823
