= Spanish conquest of Sardinia =

1717 military campaign

Spanish expedition to Sardinia
- Part of War of the Quadruple Alliance
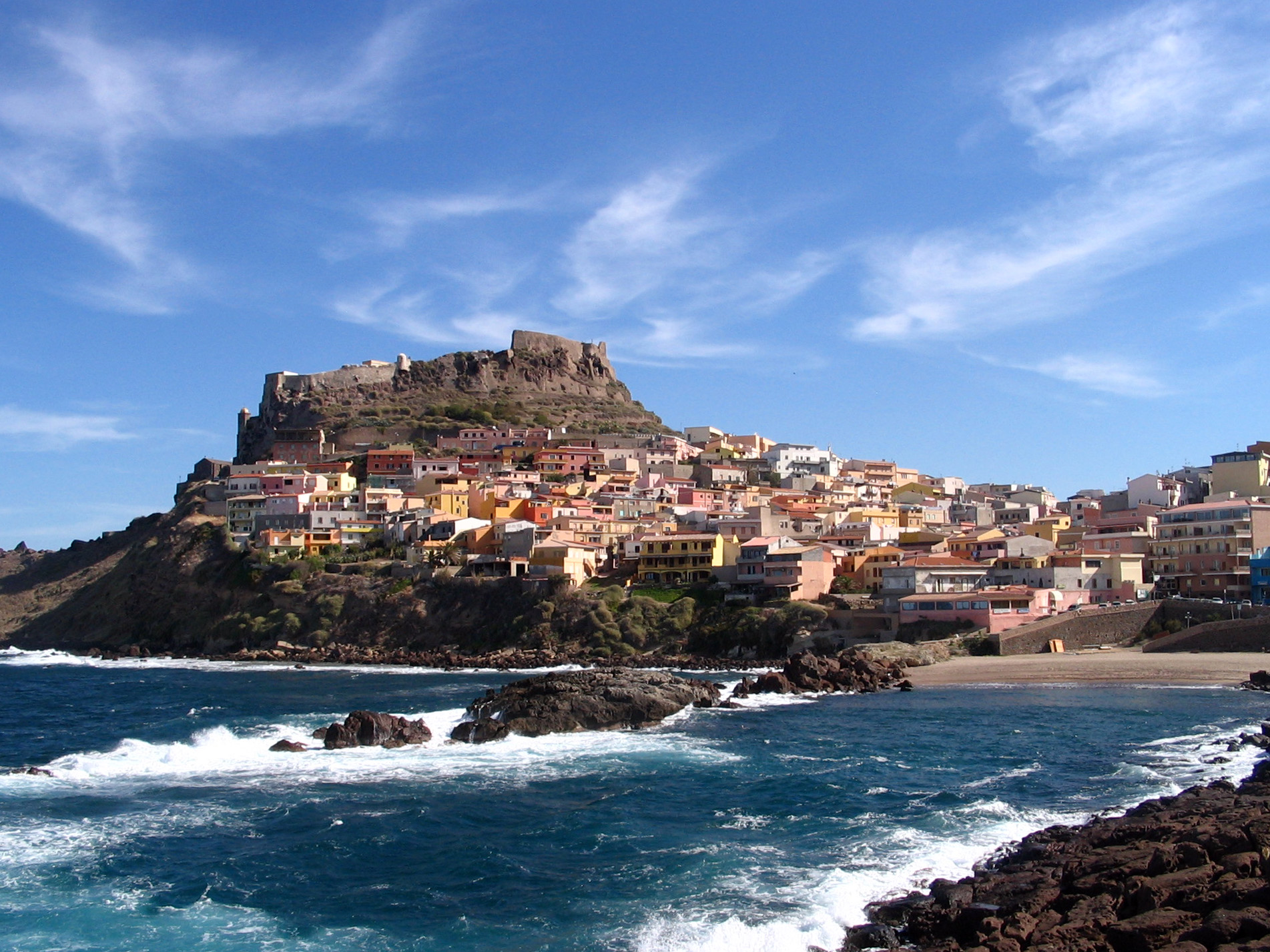
- View of the town of Castellaragonese (Spanish: Castillo Aragonés)
Date	22 August – 30 October 1717
Location	Sardinia, Holy Roman Empire (present-day Italy)
Result	Spanish victory: Spanish conquest of Sardinia; Formation of the Quadruple Alliance

Belligerents
Spain	Holy Roman Empire

Commanders and leaders
(Spain) Marquis of Lede (Spain) Duke of Montemar	(Holy Roman Empire) Marquis of Rubí

Strength
9,000 men 9 ships of the line 6 frigates 3 galleys 2 fireships 80 transport ships	Unknown

The Spanish conquest of Sardinia, also known as the Spanish expedition to Sardinia, took place between 22 August 1717 and 30 October 1717. It was the first military action between the Kingdom of Spain and the Holy Roman Empire after the War of the Spanish Succession (1701–1714), and was the direct cause of the War of the Quadruple Alliance (1718–1720). The Spanish troops commanded by the Marquis of Lede and Don José Carrillo de Albornoz, 1st Duke of Montemar, supported by the Spanish fleet, defeated the Emperor's troops easily, and conquered the entire island of Sardinia, which had been ruled by the Emperor since the Treaty of Rastatt (1714), returning it again and for the final time to Spain.

== Background ==
After the War of the Spanish Succession, the Treaty of Rastatt made Spain lose all possessions in Sardinia, Italy, and the Low Countries. The Kingdom of Sardinia, the Spanish Netherlands, the Duchy of Milan and the Kingdom of Naples were given to Austria, and Sicily was given to the Duke of Savoy. Those territories had been under Spanish rule for nearly two centuries, Sardinia since the 14th century, and their loss was perceived as a great blow to the country in terms of both practicality and prestige.

In 1717, with the rise of Spain as an important military power again and the ambitions of King Philip V of Spain to regain Spanish supremacy in Italy and the Mediterranean, the rest of the European powers (Great Britain, France and Austria), to strengthen the Treaty of Utrecht (1713), contemplated ceding Sicily to the Holy Roman Emperor Charles VI, but that arrangement displeased Spain, which wanted to recover the island. With that background and the arrest in Milan of Spanish Grand Inquisitor Jose Molina by the Austrians, Philip V obtained the pretext that he sought. In July, the King of Spain ordered the Spanish fleet, which had been prepared in Barcelona, to conquer Sardinia and initiated hostilities against Austria.

== Conquest ==
The bulk of the Spanish expedition sailed from the port of Barcelona on July 24; the rest of the fleet sailed on 30 July. The fleet, under the command of the Marquis de Mari, consisted of nine ships of the line, six frigates, three galleys, two fireships and 80 transport and merchant ships. The army was 8,500 infantry and 500 cavalry, commanded by the Marquis of Lede.

On 22 August, the Spanish forces landed in Sardinia and in just two months reconquered the whole island, whose defences were commanded by the Marquis of Rubi. The quick victory was mainly from the psychological action of the Marquis of San Felipe, who toured the island by encouraging the Sardinians, who were not happy with the Austrian dominion and preferred to return to Spanish rule. Only the strongholds of Alghero and Castellaragonese and the important city of Cagliari resisted. However, the Austrian troops in Cagliari, commanded by Rubi, in the absence of reinforcements soon decided to flee to the north of the island, and on 4 October, the Spanish took the city. A few days later, on 19 October, Spanish troops, led by Lede and the Duke of Montemar, laid siege to Alghero, which capitulated on 25 October. Castellaragonese fell on 30 October, and the Spanish victory was now complete.

== Consequences ==
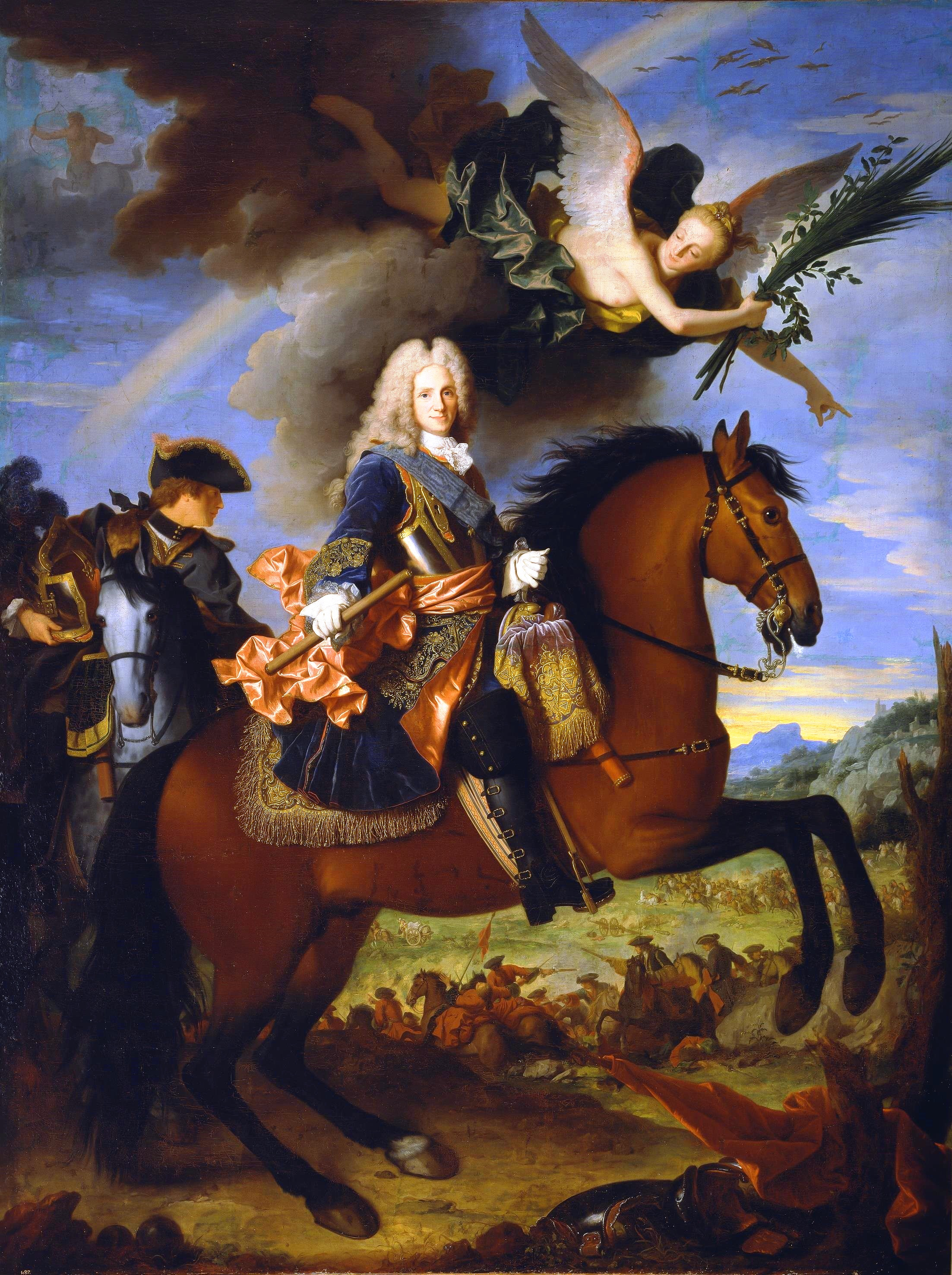
Equestrian portrait of Philip V of Spain

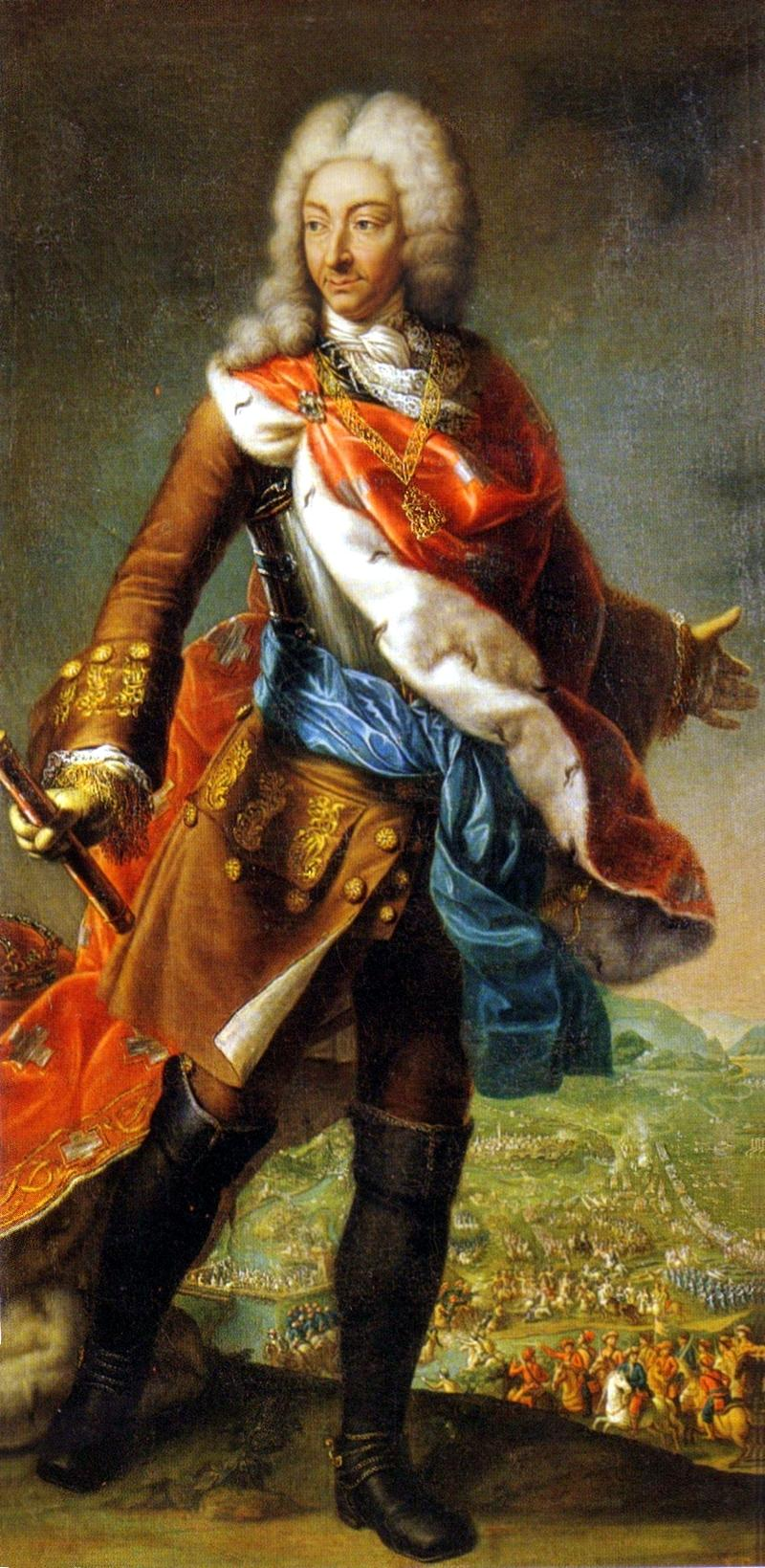
Victor Amadeus II of Savoy

The initial Austrian reaction to the invasion was limited because Austria had put all of its resources into the Austro-Turkish War of 1716–18, and the Austrian supreme commander, Prince Eugene of Savoy, wanted to avoid a great war in Italy against Spain. The Treaty of Passarowitz ended the war between the Ottoman Empire and Austria. That on 2 August led to the formation of the Quadruple Alliance.

Meanwhile, in July 1718, the Spaniards, this time with 30,000 men, including four regiments of Dragoons, again led by the Marquis of Lede, and a fleet of 350 ships, and over 250 pieces of artillery, invaded Sicily. The Spanish forces captured Palermo on 7 July, and then divided their army in two. De Lede followed the coast to besiege Messina between 18 July and 30 September, and the Duke of Montemar conquered the rest of the island.

The French, Austrians and British demanded for the Spanish to withdraw from Sicily and Sardinia. The attitude of Victor Amadeus II of Savoy was ambiguous, as he accepted negotiations with Spanish Prime Minister Cardinal Alberoni to form an anti-Austrian alliance.

At the conclusion of the war, Spain relinquished Sardinia under the terms of the 1720 Treaty of The Hague.

== See also ==
- Isabella Farnese
- List of viceroys of Sardinia
- List of viceroys of Sicily
- Triple Alliance

== Bibliography ==
- (in Spanish) Fernández Duro, Cesáreo. Armada Española desde la unión de los reinos de Castilla y Aragón. Vol/VI. Museo Naval. Madrid (1973)
- (in Spanish) Martínez Laínez, Fernando/Canales, Carlos. Banderas Lejanas. Ed. EDAF (2009) ISBN 978-84-414-2121-9
- (in Spanish) Alonso Aguilera, Miguel Ángel. La Conquista y el dominio español de Cerdeña 1717-1720. Universidad de Valladolid (1977)
- (in Spanish) Lafuente, Modesto. Historia General de España (Volume IX) Madrid (1862)
- Chandler, David G. The Art of Warfare in the Age of Marlborough. Spellmount Limited (1990) ISBN 0-946771-42-1
- (in Spanish) Suárez Fernández, Luis. Historia general de España y América: La España de las reformas: Hasta el final del reinado de Carlos IV. (1984) ISBN 84-321-2119-3
