= Juan Francisco de Bette, 3rd Marquis of Lede =

Belgian-born Spanish army officer (c. 1660 – 1725)

Juan Francisco de Bette y Croy-Solre, 3rd Marquis of Lede (c. 1660 – 11 January 1725) was a military commander in Spanish service and viceroy of Sicily. He was also lord of the Fiefdom of Lede in Flanders.

== Biography ==
Born in Lede, Flanders, son of Ambroise de Bette, 2nd Marquis of Lede and Dorotea, lady of Croÿ. His grandfather was Guillaume de Bette, 1st Marquis of Lede. He served the Spanish Crown for most of his life, including as Commander-General of Aragon and Mallorca. He became a Knight of the Golden Fleece in 1720.

He is best known for his part in the War of the Quadruple Alliance, when he commanded the Spanish troops who tried to conquer Sardinia and Sicily back from the Austrians in 1718–1719. He was victorious in the Battle of Milazzo (1718) and Battle of Francavilla (1719). The Quadruple Alliance was constituted on 2 August 1718 by Austria, Great Britain, France, and Savoy against the wishes of the Spaniards on controlling again the Kingdoms of Sardinia, Sicily, and Naples as they had over the last three centuries before the Treaties of Utrecht and Rastatt.

Following the War of the Spanish Succession (1701–1714), Lede was appointed governor of Barcelona. In 1715, he was appointed captain-general of Mallorca and Ibiza.

In 1720–1721, he led a successful expedition to lift the Siege of Ceuta by Sultan Moulay Ismail. He was awarded the title of Grandee of Spain by King Philip V of Spain in 1721. He was also president of the Spanish War Council, 1724. He died at Madrid in 1725.

His only son, Emannuel de Bette, 4th Marquis of Lede, died without issue.

== Ancestors ==
Ancestors of Juan Francisco de Bette, 3rd Marquis of Lede

4. Guillaume de Bette, 1st Marquess of Lede.
2. Ambroise de Bette, 2nd Marquess of Lede.
5. Anne Maria, lady of Hornes.
1. Jean François de Bette, 3rd Marquess of Lede.
6. Philippe Emmanuel of Croy Solre.
3.Dorothea Birgitte, lady of Croÿ.
7. Isabelle Villain
