= Treaty of Rastatt =

1714 treaty between France and Austria

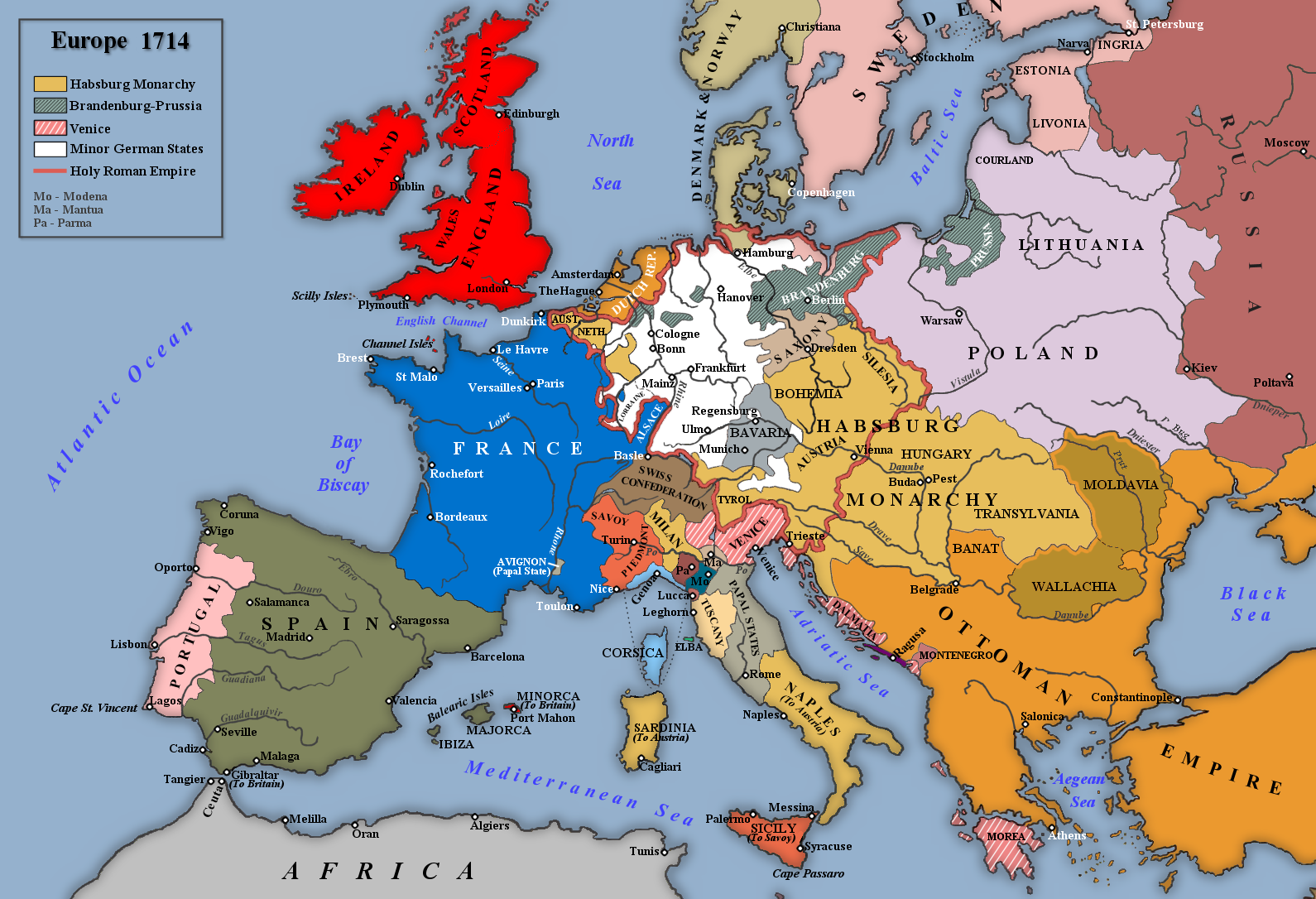
- Europe after the treaties of Utrecht, Rastatt, and Baden
- Context: End of the War of the Spanish Succession
- Signed: 7 March 1714
- Location: Rastatt, Margraviate of Baden-Baden
- Negotiators: (Kingdom of France) Claude Louis, Duke of Villars; (Habsburg monarchy) Prince Eugene of Savoy
- Parties: Kingdom of France; Habsburg monarchy (Austria)
- Language: French

The Treaty of Rastatt was a peace treaty between France and Austria that was concluded on 7 March 1714 in the Baden city of Rastatt to end the War of the Spanish Succession between both countries. The treaty followed the Treaty of Utrecht of 11 April 1713, which had ended hostilities between France and Spain, on the one hand, and Great Britain and the Dutch Republic, on the other. A third treaty at Baden, Switzerland, was required to end the hostilities between France and the Holy Roman Empire.

By 1713, all parties to the war had been militarily depleted, and it was unlikely that continuing the conflict would bring about any results in the foreseeable future. The First Congress of Rastatt opened in November 1713 between France and Austria. The negotiations culminated in the Treaty of Rastatt on 7 March 1714, which ended hostilities and complemented the Treaty of Utrecht, which had been signed the previous year.

The Treaty of Rastatt was negotiated by Marshal of France, Claude Louis Hector de Villars, and the Austrian Prince Eugene of Savoy.

The treaty is associated with changes in European politics to emphasise the balance of power.

== Background ==
Austria began to negotiate the treaty with France after it had been abandoned by its allies, particularly Great Britain, during the negotiations for the Treaty of Utrecht. Great Britain feared a possible personal union of Austria and Spain under the Emperor Charles VI, who took the imperial throne in 1711 and claimed the Spanish throne, since that would shift the European balance of power toward the House of Habsburg.

In June 1713, France launched its Rhine campaign against the Holy Roman Empire and conquered Kaiserslautern, Landau and Breisgau. After those defeats, Emperor Charles VI accepted an offer by Louis XIV of France to reopen negotiations.

== Territorial changes ==
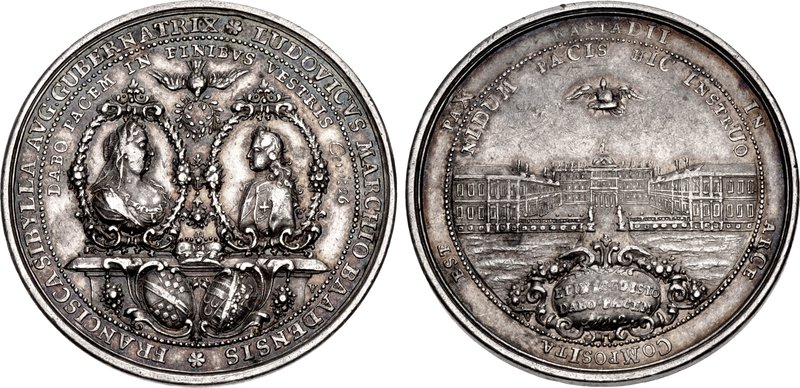
Silver commemorative medal minted to mark the Treaty of Rastatt, dated 1714. Obv: busts of Franziska Sibylle Auguste and her son Ludwig Georg. Rev: view of the entrance of Schloss Rastatt

Under the treaty, Austria received the Spanish territories in Italy, namely Naples, Milan, and Sardinia. It also received the Spanish Netherlands. Austria also gained Freiburg and several other small areas at its eastern borders from France. However, France retained Landau.

As a result of the treaty, the Habsburg Empire reached its largest territorial extent since the division of the possessions of Charles V in 1556. Moreover, bargaining in Rastatt enabled Austria to gain much more than it was offered at Utrecht, where it had originally also participated as a negotiating party. However, Emperor Charles VI was outraged at the loss of Spain and thus considered the war's outcome an unacceptable failure.

For France, the treaties of Utrecht and Rastatt confirmed that the throne of Spain would belong to the House of Bourbon, but denied France the additional territorial gains that it had sought. The treaties also affirmed that the thrones of France and Spain could not be united.

== See also ==
- List of treaties
