= Treaty of The Hague (1720) =

Treaty ending the War of the Quadruple Alliance

1720 Treaty of The Hague
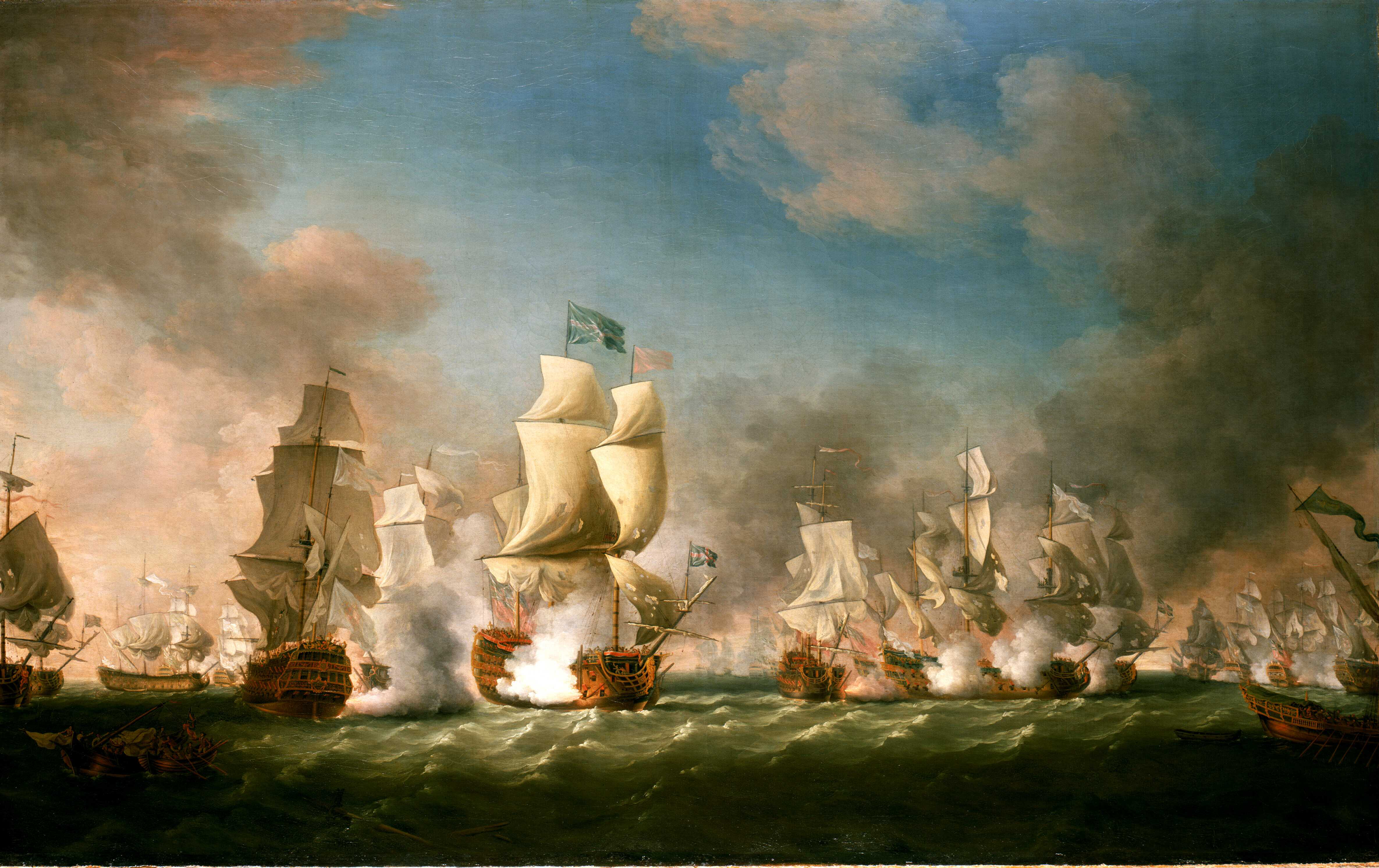
- The Battle of Cape Passaro, 11 August 1718
- Context: Philip V and Emperor Charles VI confirm terms of Treaty of Utrecht; Spain renounces claims to its former Italian possessions Savoy and Austria swap Sicily for Sardinia; Charles of Spain made heir to the Duchies of Parma and Tuscany
- Signed: 17 February 1720
- Location: The Hague
- Effective: 20 May 1720
- Negotiators: (United Kingdom) Earl Stanhope; (Kingdom of France) Guillaume Dubois
- Parties: Great Britain; (Habsburg monarchy) Austria; France; Savoy; Dutch Republic; (Spain) Spanish Empire
- Language: Neo-Latin

The Treaty of The Hague was signed on 17 February 1720 between Spain and the Quadruple Alliance, established by the 1718 Treaty of London. Its members included Britain, France, the Dutch Republic and Austria.

By signing, Spain joined the Alliance, ending the War of the Quadruple Alliance and accepting the terms of the Treaty of London. As previously agreed at Utrecht in 1713, Philip V confirmed his renunciation of the French throne and Spanish claims to their former Italian possessions. In exchange, Emperor Charles VI renounced his claim on the Spanish throne and four-year-old Charles of Spain was recognised as heir to the Duchies of Parma and Tuscany.

In another clause, Savoy and Austria exchanged Sicily for Sardinia.

== Background ==
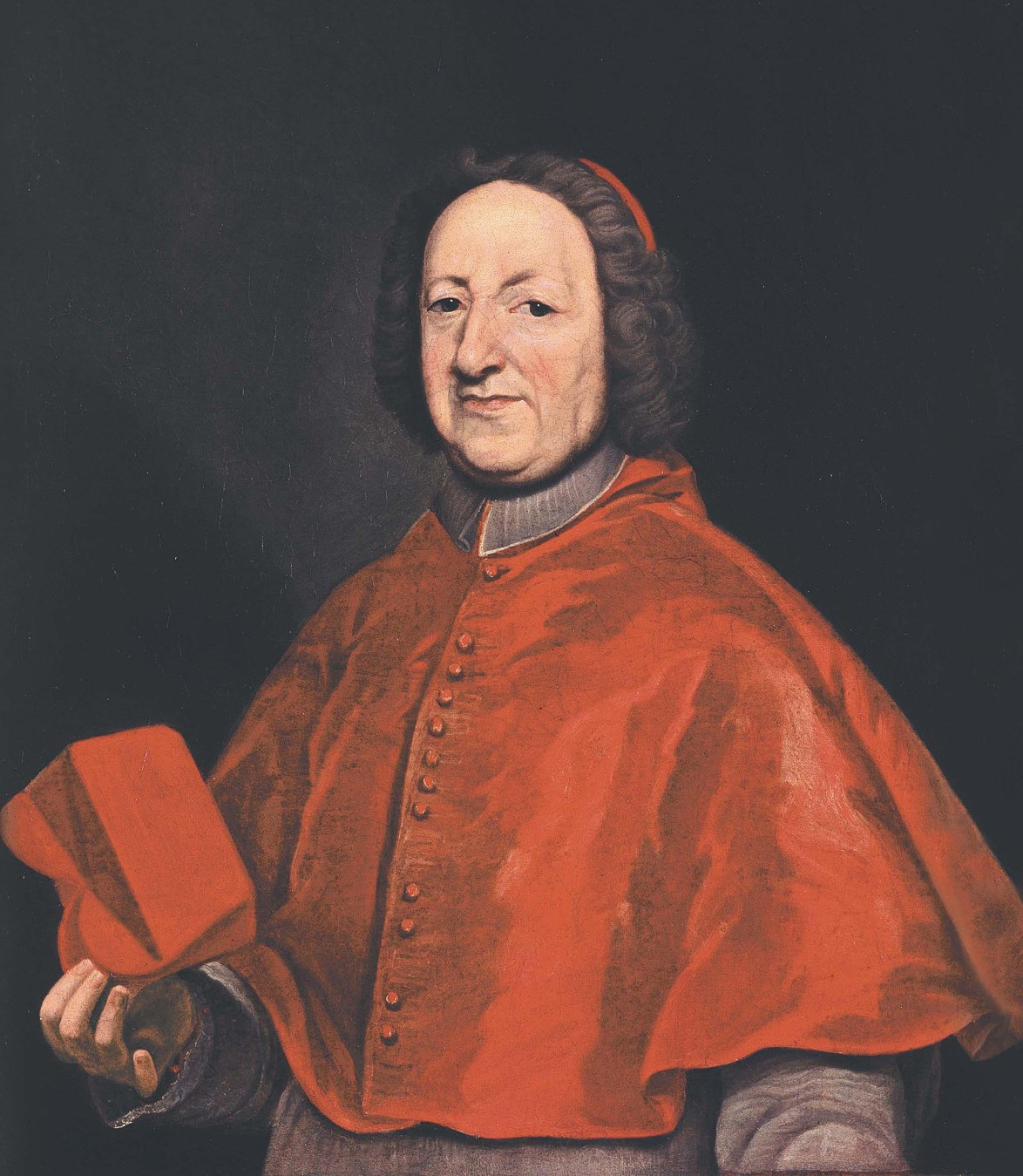
Spanish Chief Minister Cardinal Giulio Alberoni

The central principle of the 1713 Treaty of Utrecht ending the 1701 to 1714 War of the Spanish Succession was that neither France nor Austria could be united with Spain. In return, Philip V, grandson of Louis XIV, was confirmed as the first Bourbon king of Spain. He ceded Naples, Sardinia, Milan and the Southern Netherlands to Austria, and Sicily to Savoy, while Britain retained Gibraltar and Menorca.

Philip viewed regaining these as vital to his prestige and this became the key foreign policy objective for Spain's new Chief Minister, Cardinal Giulio Alberoni. A native of Parma, Alberoni arranged the 1714 marriage between Philip and Elisabeth Farnese, niece of the Duke of Parma. She also supported this policy; Philip had two sons from his first marriage next in line to the Spanish throne and she wanted to create an Italian inheritance for her own children.

When Louis XIV died in 1715, his five-year-old great-grandson became Louis XV; if he died, the closest legitimate heir was his uncle, Philip of Spain, casting doubt on the renunciation made at Utrecht. Emperor Charles VI, Austrian candidate for the Spanish throne until becoming Holy Roman Emperor in 1711, also refused to formally renounce his claim. The Duke of Orléans, who served as Regent during Louis XV's minority, needed peace to rebuild the economy, which meant ensuring compliance with Utrecht; since this required British support, it led to the 1716 Anglo-French alliance.

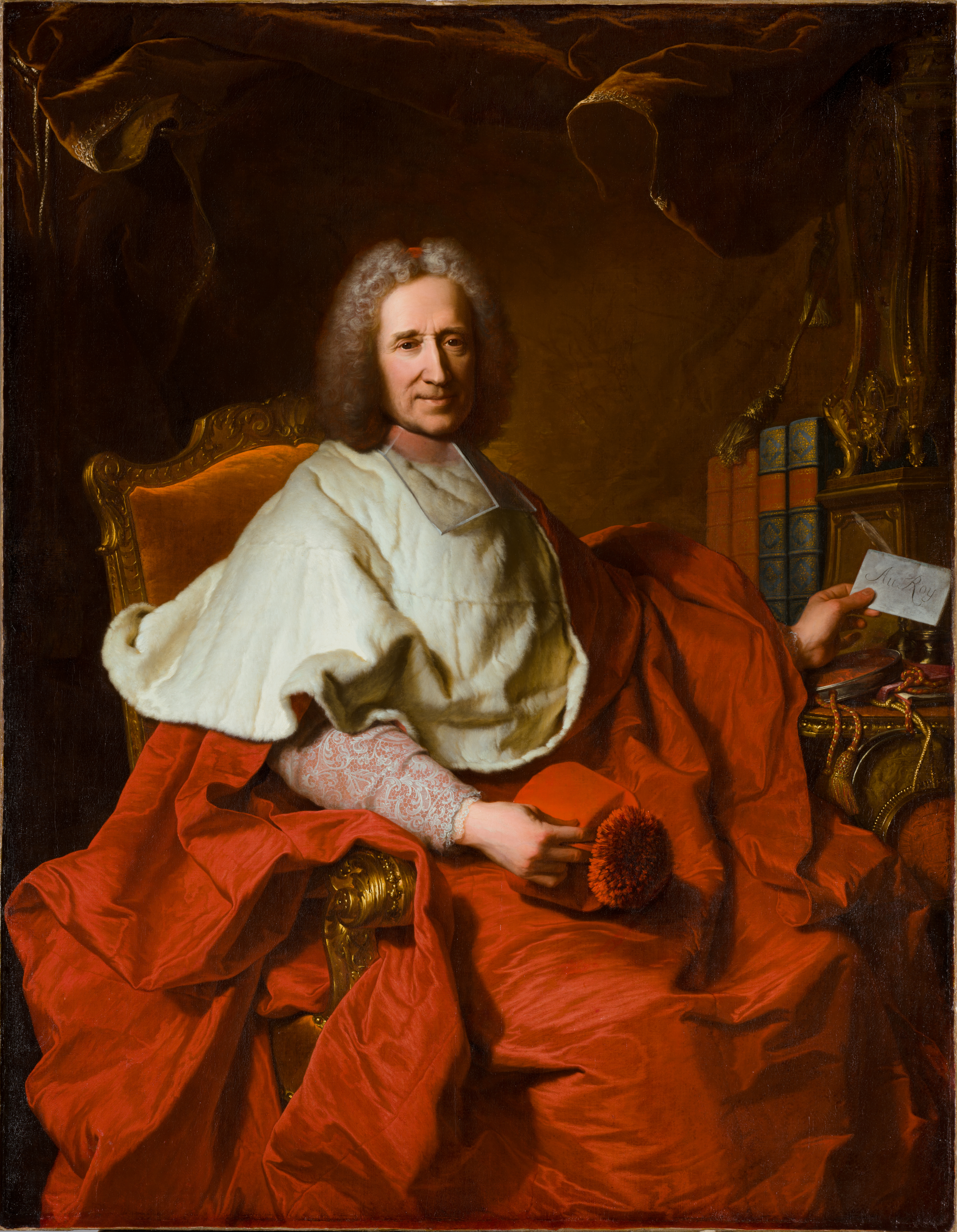
Portrait of Cardinal Dubois by Hyacinthe Rigaud. French Foreign Minister Abbe Guillaume Dubois, who agreed the terms of the Treaty with Earl Stanhope

Austria had delayed implementation of the Dutch Barrier, an objective for which the Dutch Republic effectively bankrupted themselves. In January 1717, they joined France and Britain in the 1717 Triple Alliance, which reiterated the provisions of Utrecht and agreed Savoy and Austria would exchange Sicily and Sardinia. Alberoni calculated neither Britain or France would fight for these and with Austria involved in the 1716-1718 Austro-Turkish War, Spain occupied Sardinia unopposed in 1717. In early 1718, he began preparing for an attack on Sicily; unlike Sardinia, this was considered vital for British trade and in June, a naval force under Admiral Byng arrived in the Western Mediterranean as a deterrent.

To prevent an escalation, British chief minister Earl Stanhope and Guillaume Dubois, French Foreign Minister, offered Philip the Italian duchies of Parma and Tuscany. However, he rejected this and Spanish forces landed on Sicily in early July; in response, Britain and France agreed the Treaty of London on 18 July, setting out their terms for ending these disputes and inviting Austria, Spain and Savoy to join. After signing the Treaty of Passarowitz with the Ottoman Empire on 22 July, Austria joined the Alliance on 2 August.

Although Byng's squadron destroyed the Spanish fleet at the Battle of Cape Passaro on 11 August, Philip still hoped to negotiate control of Sicily. This was due to tensions within the Alliance; anxious to protect their Spanish trade, the Dutch Republic refused to join the war while many French statesmen preferred an alliance with Philip, rather than Britain. This was strengthened by Spain granting trade privileges to French merchants and chartering French ships to resupply their forces in Sicily.

However, the discovery in December 1718 of a Spanish-backed conspiracy to replace Orléans as Regent allowed him to position his response as an attack on Alberoni, not Philip, and France declared war on 2 January 1719. Austrian forces in Sicily had mixed success but without control of the sea, Spanish defeat was inevitable. An attempt to divert British resources with the 1719 Jacobite Rising failed, while the Capture of Vigo in October showed how vulnerable the Spanish coastline was to the Royal Navy. Philip dismissed Alberoni in December 1719 and agreed to end the war.

== Terms ==
There was minimal discussion of terms; by joining the Quadruple Alliance on 17 February 1720, Spain confirmed acceptance of the terms agreed by France, Britain, the Dutch Republic and Habsburg Austria on 2 August 1718. These included confirmation that neither France nor Austria could be united with Spain, agreed Savoy and Austria would exchange Sicily and Sardinia and made Philip's third son Charles of Spain heir to Parma, Piacenza and Tuscany.

== Aftermath ==
The treaty failed to end concerns over attempts to alter the Utrecht settlement, illustrated by the 1721 Treaty of Madrid, a mutual defence agreement between France, Spain and Britain. The British monarch, George I, agreed to raise the question of returning Gibraltar in Parliament 'at a favourable opportunity', which the Spanish viewed as a commitment to return it. Commercial tensions between the two countries and frustration at the lack of progress would lead to a new Anglo-Spanish War in 1727.

== Sources ==
- Blackmore, David S.T. (2010). Warfare on the Mediterranean in the Age of Sail: A History, 1571-1866. McFarland & Co. ISBN 978-0786447992.
- Dhondt, Frederick (2017). "Trade and the War of the Quadruple Alliance 1718-1720". The Journal for Renaissance and Early Modern Diplomatic Studies. 1. doi:10.12775/LEGATIO.2017.04. hdl:10067/1517250151162165141.
- Hargreaves-Mawdsley, W.N (1973). Spain Under the Bourbons, 1700-1833. Macmillan. ISBN 978-0333106846.
- Lindsay, JO (1957). International Relations in The New Cambridge Modern History: Volume 7, The Old Regime, 1713–1763. Cambridge University Press. ISBN 978-0521045452.
- Onnekink, David; Rommelse, Gijs, eds. (2016). Ideology and Foreign Policy in Early Modern Europe (1650-1750) Politics and Culture in Europe, 1650-1750. Routledge. ISBN 9781317118992.
- Simms, Brendan (2008). Three Victories and a Defeat: The Rise and Fall of the First British Empire, 1714-1783. Penguin Books. ISBN 978-0140289848.
- Storrs, Christopher (1999). War, Diplomacy and the Rise of Savoy, 1690–1720. Cambridge University Press. ISBN 978-0521038294.
- Szechi, Daniel (1994). The Jacobites: Britain and Europe, 1688–1788 (First ed.). Manchester University Press. ISBN 978-0719037740.
- Tucker, Spencer C, ed. (2012). Almanac of American Military History; Volume I. ABC-CLIO. ISBN 978-1598845303.
- Tucker, Spencer C, ed. (2009). A Global Chronology of Conflict: From the Ancient World to the Modern Middle East. ABC-CLIO. ISBN 978-1851096671.
