= Bourbon conquest of the Two Sicilies =

Military campaign by Spain to conquer Naples and Sicily (1734–1735)

- Part of the War of the Polish Succession
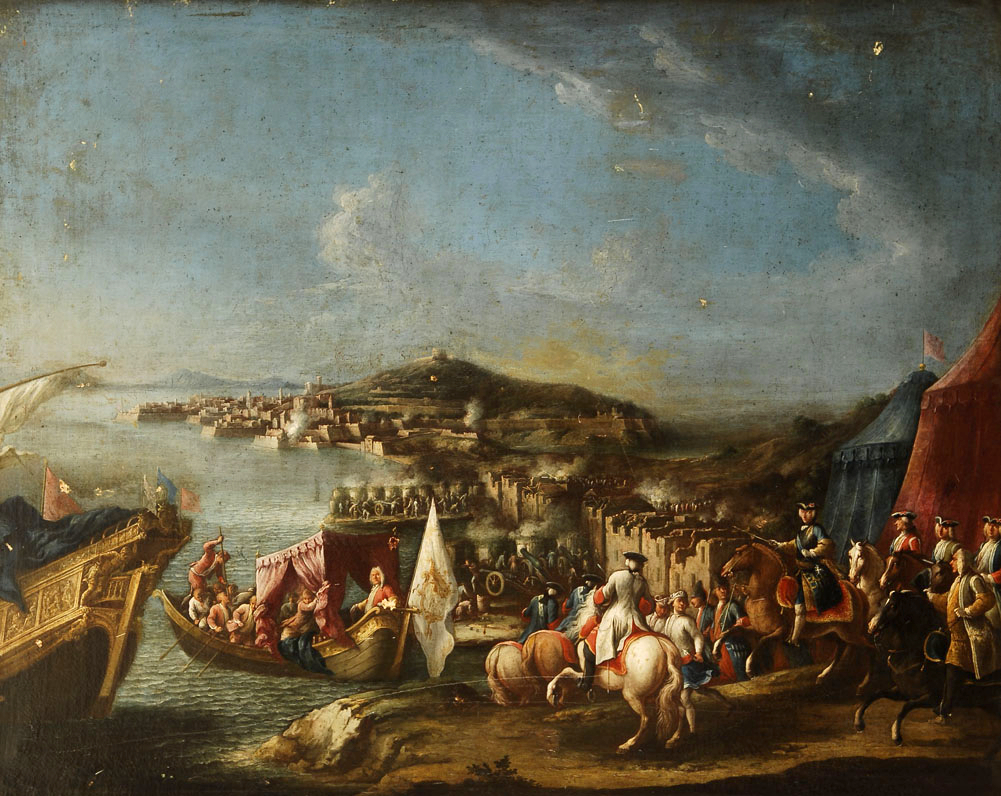
- Charles of Bourbon on horseback during the Siege of Gaeta (Giovanni Luigi Rocco, c. 1734, private collection)
Date	1734–1735
Location	Southern Italy and Sicily (Kingdom of Naples and Kingdom of Sicily)
Result	Spanish victory and establishment of the Bourbon monarchy in the Kingdoms of Naples and Sicily, recognized by European powers with the Treaty of Vienna (1738)

Belligerents
Spain	Austria

Commanders and leaders
Charles of Bourbon^{1} Count of Montemar; Count of Charny; Duke of Berwick and Liria; Count of Marsillac; Marquis of Pozzoblanco; Duke of Veraguas; Duke of Castropignano; Marquis of Castelforte; Marquis of Las Minas; Count of Mazeda; Marquess of Gracia Real Naval forces: Gabriel Perez de Alderete; Count of Clavijo	Giovanni Carafa; Count of Traun; Prince of Belmonte Naval forces: Giovanni Luca Pallavicini

Strength
Approximately 14,000	7,082 (Kingdom of Naples)
- ^{1}Nominal command

The Bourbon conquest of the Two Sicilies took place between 1734 and 1735 during the War of the Polish Succession, when Spain, under Philip V, invaded the Kingdom of Naples and the Kingdom of Sicily, both then under Austrian dominion.

In keeping with the balance of power politics that governed 18th-century international relations, the victorious military campaign did not result in the two kingdoms reverting to Spanish viceroyalties as in previous centuries. Instead, they regained their former independence. Philip V's son by his second wife, Elisabeth Farnese, the Infante Don Charles—already Duke of Parma—ascended the throne as the first ruler of the Bourbon dynasty of Naples.

The conquest sparked tensions with Pope Clement XII, who, as holder of centuries-old feudal rights over the kingdoms, granted Charles investiture only in May 1738. International recognition of the new dynasty came in November of that year with the Treaty of Vienna (1738), at the cost of ceding the Duchy of Parma and Piacenza to the Habsburgs and the Grand Duchy of Tuscany to the Lorraine dynasty.

== The Two Sicilies contested between Habsburgs and Bourbons ==
At the dawn of the 18th century, the death of Spain's Charles II without direct heirs marked the extinction of the Spanish Habsburg line and hastened the irreversible decline of Iberian power. The ensuing dynastic crisis pitted the Bourbons of France against the Imperial Habsburgs, who respectively supported Philip of Anjou, grandson of France's Louis XIV, and Archduke Charles of Habsburg, younger son of Emperor Leopold I, for the Spanish throne. Benefiting from Charles II's will, Philip occupied Spain in early 1701 and was crowned as Philip V.

After two centuries of Spanish viceregal rule, Neapolitan nobles began to nurture aspirations for independence, seeing the dynastic crisis as a chance to break free from Iberian control. When the War of the Spanish Succession erupted, Emperor Leopold, aiming to win Neapolitan favor, declared in August 1701:

The Kingdom of Naples, by declaring for the Most August [House of Austria], shall not be a province of our Crown, but shall have as its own King the Most Serene Archduke Charles, our most beloved son, by whom it shall be personally governed...

This prospect of a resident sovereign rallied part of the kingdom's nobility to the Habsburg cause. In September, they launched an unsuccessful uprising against Philip V's loyal viceroy, Duke of Medinaceli, known as the Conspiracy of Macchia. To solidify his rule and counter Austrian-backed anti-Bourbon propaganda, Philip V visited Naples in 1702, arriving on 17 April to great festivities and remaining until 2 June. He granted favors to the populace and titles to loyal nobles—the first Spanish king to visit his Italian domains in over a century and a half. (Note: The last was Charles V, who visited Sicily and resided in Naples from 25 November 1535 to 22 March 1536. See Lorenzo Giustiniani, "Dizionario geografico-ragionato del Regno di Napoli", Naples, 1802, vol. V, p. 250.) However, the Italian front of the war soon turned in Austria's favor, and in 1707, Habsburg forces invaded and swiftly conquered the Kingdom of Naples. Despite the dynastic shift, Neapolitan hopes for independence remained unfulfilled, as Archduke Charles ruled from abroad—first from Barcelona, where he had been proclaimed King Charles III of Spain in 1704, and later from Vienna after succeeding his brother Joseph I as Emperor Charles VI in 1711.

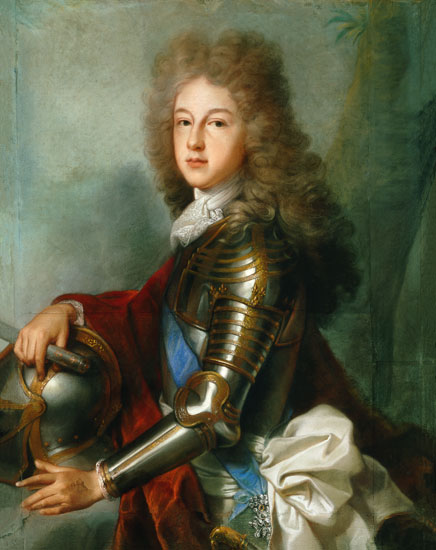
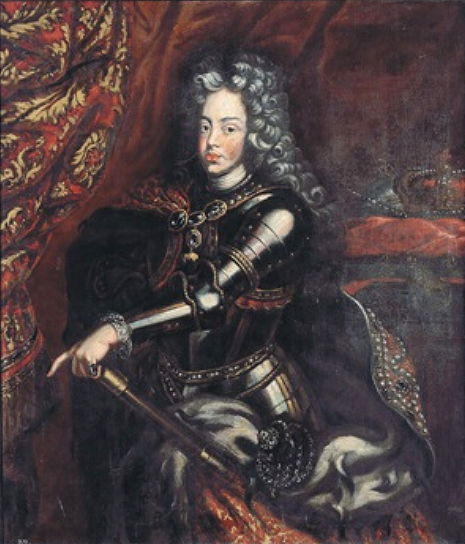
The two contenders of the War of the Spanish Succession (1701–1714): on the left, Philip of Anjou; on the right, Charles of Austria. At the war's end, Philip retained Spain and its American colonies, while Charles—by then Emperor—gained the Kingdoms of Naples and Sardinia, the Duchy of Milan, and Flanders.

The Peace of Utrecht (1713) and Treaty of Rastatt (1714), which concluded the conflict, left Philip V with only Spain and its overseas colonies, dismantling the European holdings of the Spanish Empire. Spanish dominance in Italy ended, with the Kingdom of Naples (including the Tuscan Presidi), the Kingdom of Sardinia, and the Duchy of Milan ceded de jure to Charles VI, who already held them de facto. The Kingdom of Sicily passed to Duke Victor Amadeus II of Savoy, who was elevated to the rank of king. In Naples, Spanish viceregal rule gave way to Austrian governance, heavily influenced by Spanish exiles—mostly Catalans—who had sided with Charles VI. To the Emperor, who reluctantly abandoned his claim to Spain, these loyal subjects were invaluable, surpassing even the ablest Germans or Italians in governing former Spanish territories.

Austrian rule in Naples thus bore the dual imprint of Habsburg and Spanish domination, doubling the burden on its subjects. Yet, bolstered by the exile of many Bourbon supporters, Austria maintained firm control, enjoying broad popular support. Among the nobility, despite initial pro-Habsburg independence aspirations, some argued that being subjects of a small independent monarchy was less advantageous than serving a vast imperial one. The former offered only provincial administration, while the latter opened paths to governing viceroyalties or commanding large military forces. Barons also benefited from reforms that weakened viceregal authority, allowing freer management of their fiefs, and found refuge in Vienna from local justice.

== Charles of Bourbon's arrival in Italy ==
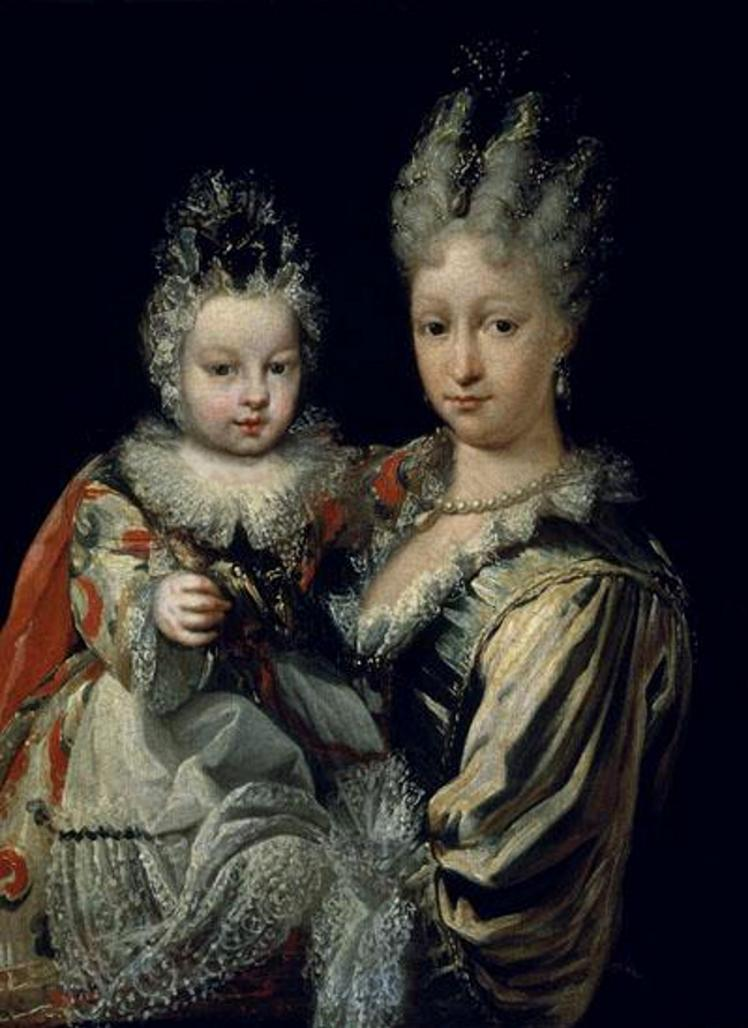
Elisabeth Farnese with her eldest son Charles, 1716

The following years saw Spain pursue military and diplomatic efforts to reclaim territory and influence in Italy. These expansionist ambitions gained momentum from both national revanche and the driving force behind Bourbon foreign policy: Queen Elisabeth Farnese, Philip V's second wife. Born an Italian princess, Farnese brought dynastic claims to her native Duchy of Parma and Piacenza and the neighboring Grand Duchy of Tuscany. These states, ruled by the waning Farnese and Medici dynasties, were also coveted by Emperor Charles VI due to their feudal ties to the Holy Roman Empire.

On 20 January 1716, Elisabeth gave birth to Infante Don Charles, whose placement on a throne became her paramount concern and Spain's ultimate international objective. With the Spanish throne seemingly out of reach—preceded by his half-brothers Louis and Ferdinand—Charles's only path to a crown lay in Italy. Spain's first attempt to regain ground came in 1717–1718 with invasions of Sardinia and then Sicily. Austria, Britain, the United Provinces, and even France—Philip V's homeland (Note: In Paris, Regent Philippe II of Orléans governed, contested by Philip V over the guardianship of young Louis XV and thus control of France. In 1718, Spain's failed Cellamare conspiracy to depose the regent prompted French intervention. See Giuseppe Scichilone, "Cellamare, Antonio del Giudice, duca di Giovinazzo, principe di", Dizionario Biografico degli Italiani, vol. 23, 1979.)—formed an alliance against Spain (Treaty of London (1718)). The resulting War of the Quadruple Alliance ended in Spanish defeat, restoring the Utrecht equilibrium.

The victorious powers forced Spain to accept the Treaty of The Hague (1720), which recognized Charles's rights to Parma and Tuscany but reaffirmed their feudal subordination to the Empire. To legitimately take possession, Charles required investiture from Charles VI, who viewed a Bourbon dynasty in central Italy with suspicion, fearing it as a stepping stone to broader encroachment. The treaty also saw Charles VI trade Sardinia for Sicily with Victor Amadeus II, uniting the Two Sicilies under his rule. However, the kingdoms remained politically distinct, each governed by separate viceroys as under Spanish rule.

Upon the childless death of Parma's Duke Antonio Farnese in October 1731, an Anglo-Spanish fleet landed 6,000 soldiers at Livorno. In December, the 15-year-old Charles arrived, entrusted to his tutor, Count of Santisteban. Ignoring imperial investiture per Madrid's directives, he took possession of Tuscany—set to inherit it upon Grand Duke Gian Gastone de' Medici's death—and settled in the Farnese duchy, governed by his maternal grandmother, Dowager Duchess Dorothea Sophie of Neuburg. By bypassing feudal obligations, Charles strained Austria-Spain relations, setting the stage for war and prompting Madrid to devise bolder conquest plans.

== Outbreak of the War of the Polish Succession ==
The casus belli for a new European conflict arose in 1733 with the death of Poland's Augustus II. The Polish–Lithuanian Commonwealth, as an elective monarchy, chose between Saxony's Elector Frederick Augustus II—son of the late king, backed by Russia, Austria, and Prussia—and Stanisław Leszczyński, supported by Sweden and France, where he was Louis XV's father-in-law. Leszczyński's election in September was overturned by Russian intervention, which secured Augustus III's crowning. Unable to strike Russia directly, France allied with Sardinia under Charles Emmanuel III and declared war on Austria in October, attacking along the Rhine and in Lombardy. Paris also courted Spain's entry into the Franco-Sardinian league.

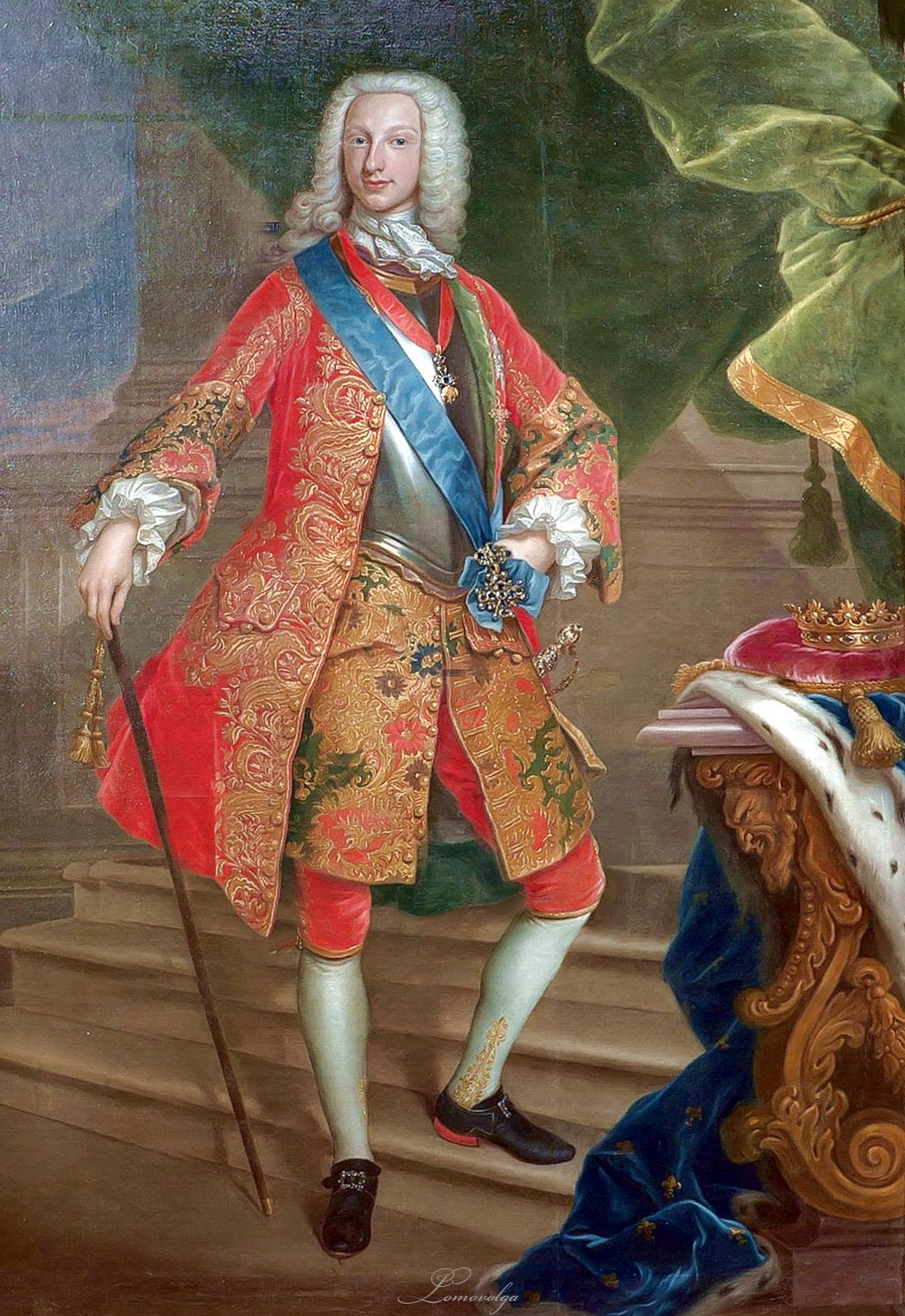
Charles, Duke of Parma, by Giovanni Maria delle Piane (Il Mulinaretto), 1732, Royal Palace of La Granja de San Ildefonso

Initially, Elisabeth Farnese aimed to secure for her sons—Charles, followed by Philip and Luis—the Polish throne, the Two Sicilies, Flanders, and the Duchy of Mantua, merging the latter with Charles's central Italian holdings. Philip V sought to restore a Spanish empire encompassing territories lost in 1713. France's chief minister, Cardinal Fleury, balanced Spanish ambitions with the Treaty of Turin (1733), signed 26 September with Charles Emmanuel III, assigning Milan to Sardinia and the Two Sicilies, including the State of the Presidi, to Charles, without requiring Sardinian military aid. Spain refused, demanding that Franco-Sardinian forces join Charles in conquering all Austrian Italian territories—except Milan—for his immediate rule.

French troops under the aged Marshal Villars joined Charles Emmanuel to conquer Lombardy within three months. Meanwhile, Louis XV persuaded Philip V to forge a Bourbon alliance via the Treaty of the Escorial (7 November 1733), or Family Compact, granting Charles his conquests and existing states.

This treaty clashed with Turin's terms, sparking a dispute over Mantua, promised to both Elisabeth Farnese and Charles Emmanuel. Fearing Mantua's loss would stifle Sardinia's expansion and expose Lombardy to Spain, Charles Emmanuel proposed ceding it to a French-favored foreign ruler, Elector of Bavaria. Fleury insisted Mantua was essential for Spain's coalition entry. Charles Emmanuel relented but delayed its siege, citing weather, risks to occupied lands, and logistical shortages.

Villars, irked by Sardinia's refusal, saw his bold plans rejected by French commanders Coigny and Broglie. Marshal Rehbinder backed Villars but was sacked. Elisabeth thus reversed Spain's strategy, prioritizing the Two Sicilies over joining the Franco-Sardinian Alpine and Mantuan campaigns.

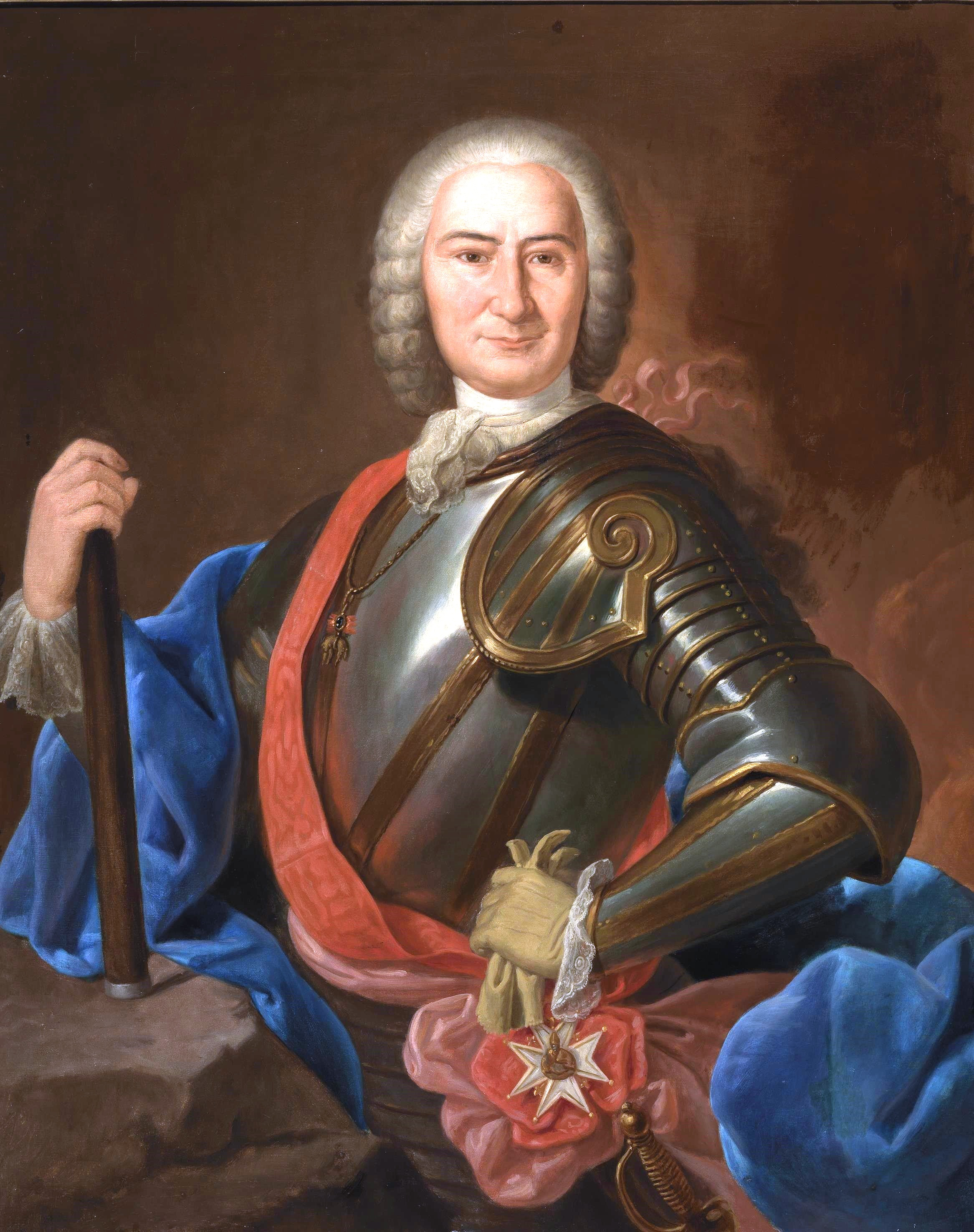
José Carrillo de Albornoz, Count of Montemar, conqueror of Oran, led the Spanish army

Spanish forces arrived in Livorno in late 1733 under Captain General Count of Montemar, famed for seizing Oran from Ottoman Algeria in 1732. Ten lieutenant generals were appointed, led by Frenchman Manuel d'Orléans, Count of Charny, who had commanded the 1731 Tuscany expedition. Others included Jacobite James Fitz-James Stuart (Note: Son of the first Duke of Berwick and Liria, who died months later at France's Siege of Philippsburg (1734), passing on his titles.) and Neapolitan Francesco Eboli, Duke of Castropignano. On 24 December, Eboli captured the Brunella Fortress in Lunigiana, a key strategic link between Tuscany and Emilia. From Pisa, Montemar notified Villars of the impending southern invasion on 7 January 1734, then joined Charles in Parma. Named generalissimo of His Most Catholic Majesty's Italian armies—a ceremonial role, with Montemar in true command—Charles declared himself free of tutelage on his 18th birthday, 20 January, per parental orders. His mother wrote, urging him to march on the Two Sicilies: "Once elevated to a free kingdom, they will be yours. Go then and conquer: Italy's finest crown awaits you".

Spain's shift from Lombardy dismayed the French command, straining an alliance already frayed by Villars's clashes with Charles Emmanuel. Villars suggested holding fortresses against a potential Sardinian defection. Charles, distressed by what he saw as a betrayal of allies—especially Villars, with whom he bonded—wrote on 14 January that his parents ordered him "to take over Naples without delay or further objection". Villars trekked from Milan to Parma across the frozen Po (25–27 January) to dissuade him, but Spain's southward course was set. In early February, Charles left Parma for Florence, stripping the city of Farnese treasures, including the Farnese Collection, to keep them from Austrian hands.

== Conquest of the Kingdom of Naples ==
Charles began his march on Naples from Florence on 24 February 1734. In Perugia on 5 March, he reviewed the troops for the campaign. After two expeditionary forces landed in Livorno in late 1733, Spain's Italian army comprised 23 infantry regiments (52 battalions), 11 cavalry (34 squadrons), and 7 dragoons (19 squadrons). Estimates of soldiers vary, from 36,000 to 14,000 effectives after accounting for garrisons in Parma and Tuscany, deaths, illness, and desertions. Montemar's April letter from Aversa to Spain's José Patiño confirms 14,000, detailing a force reduced from 21,707 (17,819 infantry, including sergeants and drummers, and 3,888 cavalry) by 2,776 sick and nearly 5,000 deserters. About 10,000 adventurers followed the army.

After plundering Mirandola, the Principality of Piombino, and the Duchy of Massa and Carrara, the Spanish troops and adventurers crossed the Papal States—permitted passage by Pope Clement XII hoping to secure feudal rights over Parma and Piacenza—committing thefts and violence despite provisions from the Pope, Charles's commissaries, and Cardinal Belluga to prevent looting. The fleet, sailing from Porto Longone and Livorno, sheltered in the port of Civitavecchia. Austria, stretched in Lombardy, lacked forces to defend the viceroyalty, yet on 10 March, Charles VI proclaimed confidence in Divine Providence and victory to the Neapolitan people. Charles, pausing at Civita Castellana and learning of local pro-Spanish sentiment and weak Austrian defenses, issued a bilingual (Spanish-Italian) proclamation from Monterotondo on 14 March. It included Philip V's 27 February dispatch from El Pardo, citing outrage at "excessive violence, oppression, and tyranny" under Austrian rule, promising pardons, respect for privileges, and tax relief. Charles added assurances against the introduction of the Inquisition.

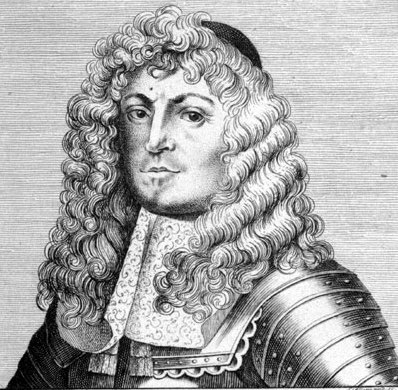
Otto Ferdinand von Abensperg und Traun, a leading Austrian officer defending the Naples viceroyalty

In Naples, wartime authority rested with Field Marshal Giovanni Carafa, commander-in-chief, overshadowing Viceroy Giulio Visconti Borromeo Arese, limited to advisory roles. Command split over defense: Carafa favored retreating south, awaiting Viennese and Sicilian reinforcements for a pitched battle; Lieutenant Marshal Otto Ferdinand von Abensperg und Traun and Vienna urged meeting the Bourbons at the northern borders.

On 20–21 March, the Spanish navy seized Procida and Ischia, later routing the viceregal fleet. On 31 March, Traun, pressed by Bourbon forces and avoiding battle, withdrew from Mignano, letting the Spanish advance. Carafa, leaving castle garrisons in Naples, retreated to Apulia, deeming border defense futile without reinforcements. The Spanish assaulted Naples in early April, while Charles received noble tributes, culminating on 9 April in Maddaloni with the city's elected delegates presenting the keys and privilege book.

Contemporary accounts note Naples was bombarded humanely, targeting only military sites, with courteous combat amid curious onlookers. The Carmine Castle fell first (10 April), followed by Castel Sant'Elmo (27 April), Castel dell'Ovo (4 May), and Castel Nuovo (6 May).

Most Neapolitan nobles favored a Spanish return, hoping Philip V would cede Naples to Charles, granting them a resident king rather than another foreign viceroy. Charles entered Naples triumphantly on 10 May 1734 via Porta Capuana, riding with advisors and trailed by coin-tossing cavalry. He proceeded along Via dei Tribunali, paused at the Naples Cathedral for Archbishop Cardinal Pignatelli's blessing, and reached the Royal Palace of Naples. Two chroniclers differed on his reception: Florentine Bartolomeo Intieri hailed it as epochal event, with crowds likening Charles's beauty to Saint Januarius's statue; Venetian Cesare Vignola noted tepid applause, spurred only by coin-throwers.

== Proclamation of independence and the Battle of Bitonto ==
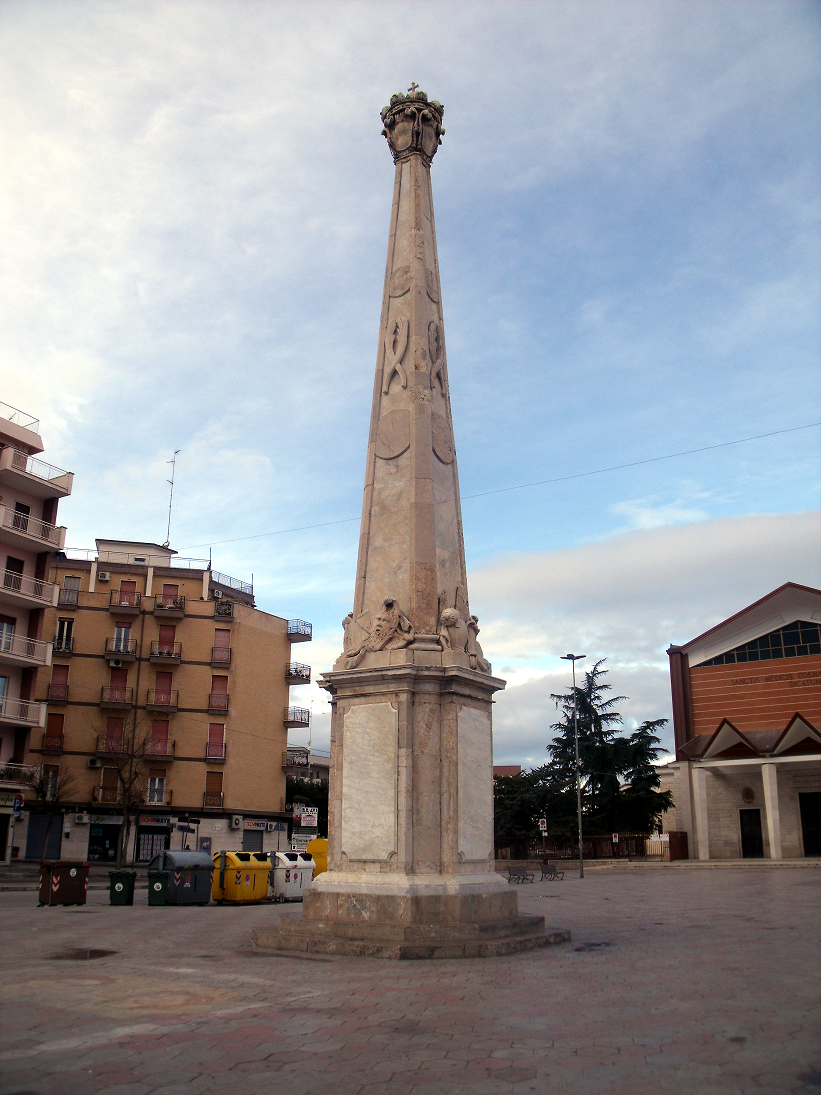
The Carolino Obelisk in Bitonto, erected to commemorate the Bourbon victory of 1734

On 15 May, Philip V declared the Kingdom of Naples independent under Charles via a dispatch and letter. The Spanish dispatch, dated 15 April, stated:

Mi muy Claro y muy amado Hijo. Por relevantes razones, y poderosos indispensables motivos havia resuelto, que en el caso de que mis Reales Armas, que he embiado à Italia para hacer la guerra al Emperador, se apoderasen del Reyno de Nàpoles os hubiese de quedar en propriedad como si vos lo hubiesedes adquirido con vuestras proprias fuerzas, y haviendo sido servido Dios de mirar por la justa causa que me asiste, y facilidar con su poderoso auxilio el mas feliz logro: Declaro que es mi voluntad que dicha conquista os pertenezca como a su legitimo Soverano en la mas ampla forma que ser pueda: Y para que lo podais hacer constar donde y quando combenga he querido manifestaroslo por esta Carta firmada de mi mano, y refrendada de mi infrascrito Consegero y Secretario de Estado y del Despacho.
My most Illustrious and beloved Son. For weighty reasons and compelling motives, I had resolved that should my Royal Armies, sent to Italy to wage war against the Emperor, seize the Kingdom of Naples, it should remain yours as if acquired by your own forces. God, favoring my just cause and aiding with His mighty support the happiest outcome, has been served: I declare it my will that said conquest belong to you as its legitimate Sovereign in the fullest form possible. To affirm this wherever and whenever fitting, I have chosen to declare it in this Letter signed by my hand and ratified by my undersigned Counselor and Secretary of State and Dispatch.

The French letter began, "To the King of Naples. My lord brother and son." Charles became the first resident king in over two centuries of viceregal rule, though the conquest was incomplete. Austrian forces under the Prince of Belmonte, succeeding Carafa, reinforced and camped near Bitonto. On 25 May, Montemar's Spanish troops attacked them, capturing thousands, including Belmonte, though Viceroy Visconti and others escaped via Bari's ships. Naples celebrated with three nights of illumination, and on 30 May, Charles honored Montemar, naming him Duke of Bitonto.

Reggio Calabria (20 June), L'Aquila (27 June), and Pescara (28 July) fell, leaving Gaeta and Capua as Austria's last peninsular strongholds. Charles attended the Siege of Gaeta, concluded 6 August. On 28 August, Montemar's forces landed in Sicily, entering Palermo on 2 September. Capua, fiercely held by Traun, surrendered on 24 November after a prolonged stand.

Blamed for losing the kingdom, Carafa was exiled to Wiener Neustadt, tried by the supreme war council, and imprisoned.

== Conquest of the Kingdom of Sicily ==
In 1734, the Kingdom of Sicily, like Naples, faced invasion by Charles's forces. By late August, two Spanish contingents landed at Palermo and Messina. Palermo fell on 2 September. Advancing with little resistance—except at Messina under Prince Lobkowitz and Syracuse under Marquis Orsini, where Austrians held out over six months, and Trapani until June 1735—the island was wrested from Habsburg control. On 3 July 1735, Charles was crowned King of Sicily in Palermo as Charles III of Sicily.

The new Bourbon monarchy freed Sicily from viceregal status, restoring formal independence, though in personal union with Naples. Despite sharing a ruler, the kingdoms retained distinct governance—Sicily's constitutional and parliamentary monarchy versus Naples' absolute rule—along with separate judicial, fiscal, and administrative systems. Sicily upheld the 1296 Constitutions of Frederick III of Sicily, each kingdom keeping its own currency and flag. Charles's reformist policies modernized administration and trade while curbing ecclesiastical and baronial power, though he soon left for Naples.

== The Investiture Dispute ==
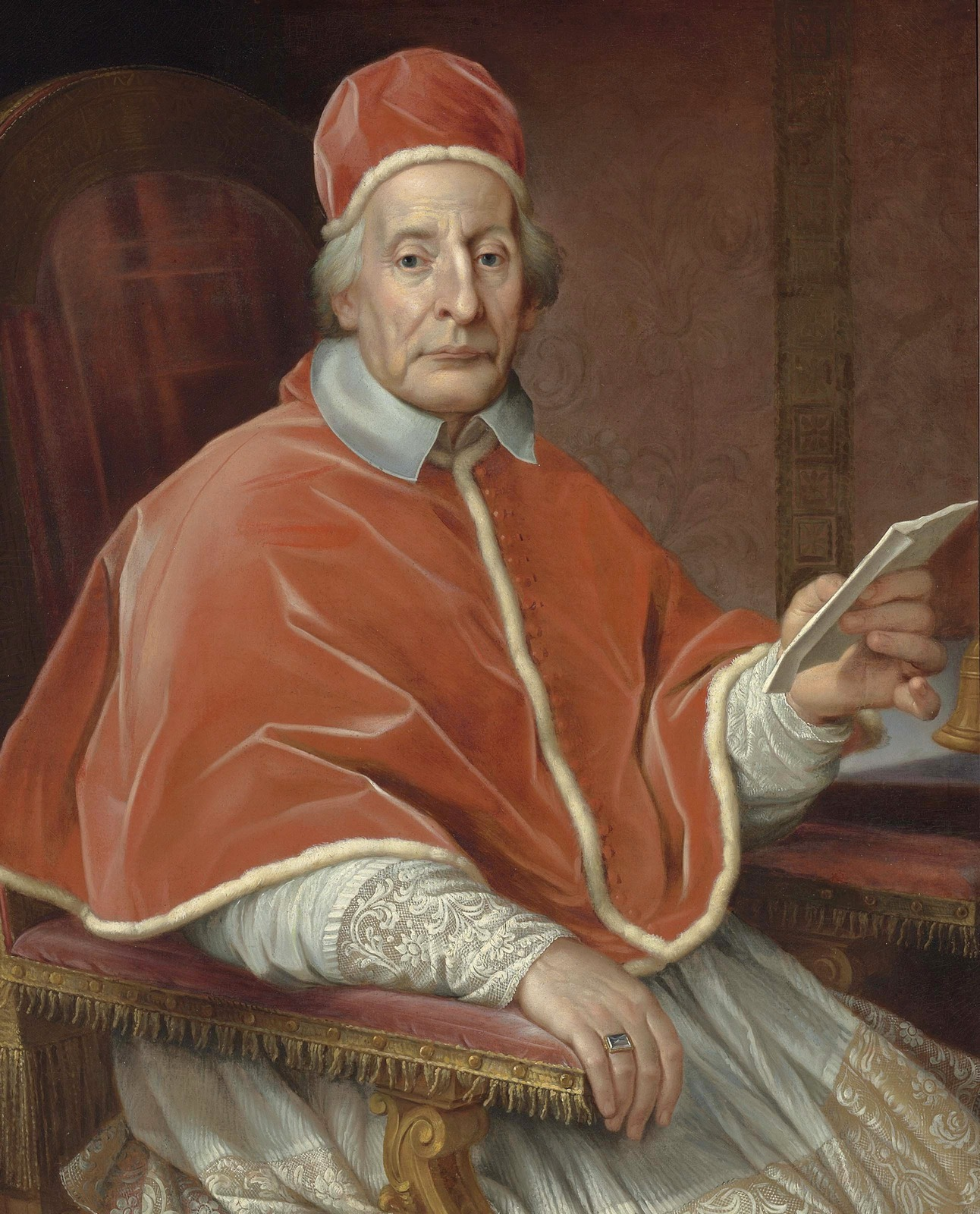
Pope Clement XII, painted by Agostino Masucci. Tensions arose between the Pope, asserting Church feudal rights, and Charles of Bourbon.

Early in Charles's reign, Naples clashed with the Holy See. Under feudal rights from the 1059 Treaty of Melfi, when Pope Nicholas II granted Robert Guiscard southern Italy and Sicily, Clement XII claimed sole authority to invest Naples' kings. He rejected Charles's legitimacy via Philip V's appointment, notifying him through the Apostolic Nuncio. A Naples junta, led by Tuscan jurist Bernardo Tanucci, deemed papal investiture unnecessary, arguing a king's coronation was not a sacrament. Tanucci curbed clerical privileges, targeting their tax-exempt estates and jurisdiction. Yet, Naples made conciliatory gestures, such as barring the return of exiled anti-clerical historian Pietro Giannone.

In 1735, as Charles prepared for his Sicilian coronation, he sent Prince Sforza Cesarini to Rome to offer the traditional chinea—a white horse and money given by Naples' kings to popes on 29 June, the feast day of Saints Peter and Paul. The Emperor, still claiming Naples, did likewise. Clement accepted the imperial chinea as customary, spurning Charles's novel offering, irking the Bourbon prince.

On 3 July, Charles was crowned King of the Two Sicilies, rex utriusque Siciliae, in Palermo Cathedral, bypassing papal authority via the Apostolic Legation of Sicily, a medieval privilege granting Sicily legal autonomy from the Church. The papal legate's absence, desired by Charles, underscored the rift.

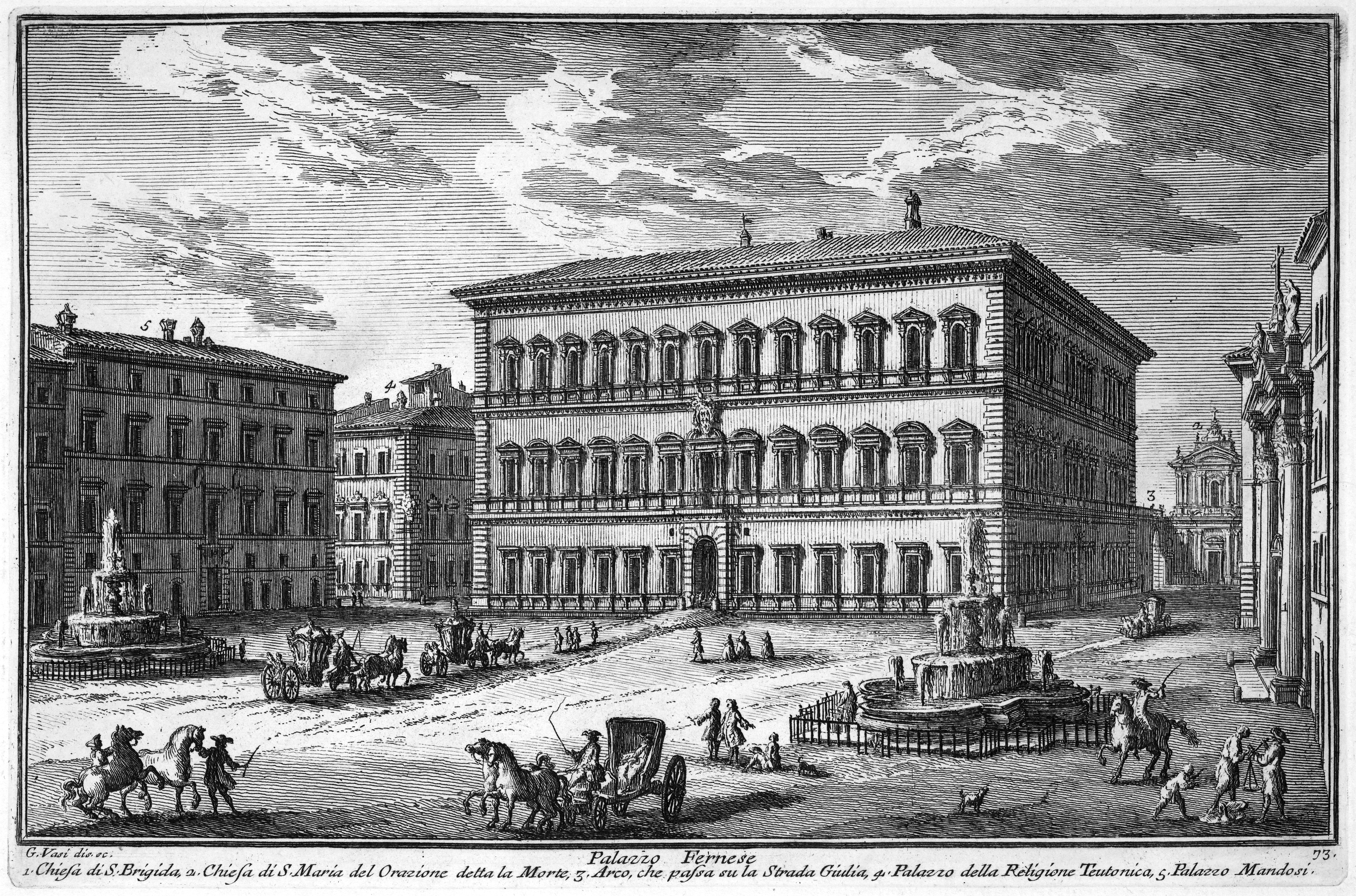
Palazzo Farnese in the 18th century, engraved by Giuseppe Vasi

In March 1736, tensions flared again. Rumors in Rome claimed Bourbons imprisoned Romans in Palazzo Farnese's dungeons—Charles's property—for forced recruitment into the Royal Army of the Two Sicilies. Thousands of Trastevere residents stormed it, looting inside, then attacked the Spanish embassy in Piazza di Spagna, killing several Bourbon soldiers, including an officer. Unrest spread to Velletri, where locals assaulted Spanish troops marching to Naples.

The sack of a royal property outraged the Bourbon courts. Spanish and Neapolitan ambassadors left Rome; papal nuncios were expelled from Madrid and Naples. Bourbon regiments crossed into the Papal States, prompting Rome to bar gates and double its civic guard. Velletri, occupied, paid 8,000 scudi as a conquered city; Ostia was looted; Palestrina paid 16,000 scudi to avoid the same fate.

A cardinal commission sent Trastevere and Velletri prisoners to Naples as reparation. Briefly jailed, they sought and received royal pardon. Charles later reconciled with the Pope, securing investiture on 12 May 1738 via Cardinal Acquaviva's mediation.

== See also ==
- Battle of Bitonto
- José Carrillo de Albornoz, 1st Duke of Montemar
- War of the Spanish Succession
- War of the Polish Succession

== Bibliography ==
- Acton, Harold (1997). I Borboni di Napoli (1734–1825) [The Bourbons of Naples (1734–1825)] (in Italian). Florence: Giunti. ISBN 88-09-21079-4.
- Ascione, Imma (2001). Lettere ai sovrani di Spagna [Letters to the Sovereigns of Spain] (in Italian). Vol. I. Rome: Ministero per i beni e le attività culturali. ISBN 88-7125-201-2.
- Botta, Carlo (1837). Storia d'Italia continuata da quella del Guicciardini sino al 1789 [History of Italy Continued from Guicciardini to 1789] (in Italian). Vol. VIII. Paris: Baudry.
- Carutti, Domenico (1859). Storia del regno di Carlo Emanuele III [History of the Reign of Charles Emmanuel III] (in Italian). Vol. I. Turin: Botta.
- Colletta, Pietro (1834). Storia del reame di Napoli dal 1734 sino al 1825 [History of the Kingdom of Naples from 1734 to 1825] (in Italian). Vol. I. Capolago: Tipografia Elvetica.
- del Pozzo, Luigi (1857). Cronaca civile e militare delle Due Sicilie sotto la dinastia borbonica dall'anno 1734 in poi [Civil and Military Chronicle of the Two Sicilies Under the Bourbon Dynasty from 1734 Onward] (in Italian). Naples: Stamperia Reale.
- Galasso, Giuseppe (2006). Il Regno di Napoli. Il Mezzogiorno spagnolo e austriaco (1622–1734) [The Kingdom of Naples: Spanish and Austrian Southern Italy (1622–1734)] (in Italian). Turin: UTET. ISBN 88-02-07298-1.
- Muratori, Ludovico Antonio (1834). Annali d'Italia dal principio dell'era volgare sino all'anno 1750 [Annals of Italy from the Common Era's Start to 1750] (in Italian). Vol. LIV. Venice: Tipografia di Giuseppe Antonelli.
- Schipa, Michelangelo (1904). Il Regno di Napoli al tempo di Carlo di Borbone [The Kingdom of Naples in the Time of Charles of Bourbon] (in Italian). Naples: Stabilimento tipografico Luigi Pierro e figlio.
- Di Pinto, Mario, ed. (1985). I Borbone di Napoli e i Borbone di Spagna. Un bilancio storiografico [The Bourbons of Naples and the Bourbons of Spain: A Historiographical Assessment] (in Italian). Vol. I. Naples: Guida. ISBN 88-7042-854-0.
