= History of early modern Italy =

The history of early modern Italy roughly corresponds to the period from the Italian Renaissance to the Congress of Vienna in 1814. The following period was characterized by political and social unrest which then led to the unification of Italy, which culminated in 1861 with the proclamation of the Kingdom of Italy.

== Overview ==
The Italian Renaissance covered the 15th and 16th centuries of Italian history and brought about considerable economic and cultural development of the country. After 1600, however, Italy experienced an economic decline. In 1600 Northern and Central Italy comprised one of the most advanced industrial areas of Europe. There was an exceptionally high standard of living. By 1814 Italy was an economically backward and depressed area; its industrial structure had almost collapsed, its population was too high for its resources, its economy had become primarily agricultural. Wars, political fractionalization, limited fiscal capacity and the shift of world trade to north-western Europe and the Americas were key factors.

Following the Peace of Cateau Cambrésis (1559), France renounced its claims in Italy. Some of the Italian states were under the rule of powerful dynasties: the Medici in Tuscany, the Farnese in Parma, the Este in Modena, and the Savoy in Piedmont. Nearly half of Italy, the kingdoms of Naples, Sicily and Sardinia and the Duchy of Milan were under the rule of the Spanish Empire.

Piedmont returned to the Savoy from France due to the role played by the duke Emmanuel Philibert in the battle of St Quentin during the Italian War of 1551–1559. The House of Savoy was "Italianized" at the end of the Italian wars, as Emmanuel Philibert made Turin the capital of the savoyard state and Italian the official language. The House of Medici kept ruling Florence, thanks to an agreement signed between the Pope and Charles V in 1530, and was later recognized as the ruling family of the Grand Duchy of Tuscany by Pope Pius V. The same Pope arranged the Holy League, a coalition of Venice and other maritime states that defeated the invading Ottoman forces at the naval battle of Lepanto (1571).

The Papal States launched the Counter-Reformation, which lasted from the Council of Trent (1545–1563) to the Peace of Westphalia in 1648. This period coincides with the European wars of religion and saw numerous Italians active in other Catholic nations, including de facto rulers of France (such as Catherine de Medici, Mary de Medici, Concino Concini and Jules Mazarin) and military generals serving under the auspices of the Holy Roman Empire or Spain (such as Torquato Conti, Raimondo Montecuccoli, Ottavio Piccolomini, Ambrogio Spinola and Alexander Farnese).

Despite the victory at Lepanto, the Venetians gradually lost its Eastern Mediterranean possessions (including Cyprus and Crete) to the Ottomans. Venice captured the Peloponnese during the Great Turkish War (1683–1699), but the land was ceded back after the last of the Venetian-Ottoman Wars. When the Seven Years' War broke out, Venice was left out of the concert of great powers: the same, however, was true for the Venetian Mediterranean rivals such as the Ottoman Empire (sick man of Europe after centuries of warfare) and the Genoese who had lost its possessions in the Aegean Sea, in Tunisia, and, later, Corsica. The crisis of Genoa led to the crisis of Spain, as the Republic of Genoa was a key ally of the Spanish Empire since the 16th century, providing credit and economic support for the Habsburgs in what has been described as the age of the Genoese.

The War of the Spanish Succession (1702–1715) and the War of the Quadruple Alliance (1718–1720) established the Habsburg monarchy as the dominant power in most of the present day Lombardy and Southern Italy (though the War of the Polish Succession resulted in the re-installment of the Spanish in the south, as the House of Bourbon-Two Sicilies). In this context Victor Amadeus II of Savoy, along with Eugene of Savoy, defeated the Franco-Spanish forces during the Siege of Turin (1706) and later formed the kingdom of Piedmont-Sardinia, predecessor state of Italy. The House of Habsburg-Lorraine succeeded the Medici of Florence in 1737 and Venice also became part of Austria with the treaty of Campo Formio in 1797.

The Napoleonic era is the link between the Habsburg domination and the Risorgimento. Napoleon's first military successes took place in Italy, at the head of the Armée d'Italie, and he later styled himself as President of Italy and King of Italy. Italy became part of the French sphere of influence but Napoleon, given his Italian ethnicity, was appreciated by most Italian intellectuals, among them the writer Alessandro Manzoni. The Restoration that followed the French defeat wasn't able to erase the political and legislative innovations brought to Italy by Napoleon. French historian Hippolyte Taine stated:

Napoleon, far more Italian than French, Italian by race, by instinct, imagination, and souvenir, considers in his plan the future of Italy, and, on casting up the final accounts of his reign, we find that the net loss is for France and the net profit is for Italy.

Frederick Artz emphasizes the benefits the Italians gained:

For nearly two decades the Italians had the excellent codes of law, a fair system of taxation, a better economic situation, and more religious and intellectual toleration than they had known for centuries. ... Everywhere old physical, economic, and intellectual barriers had been thrown down and the Italians had begun to be aware of a common nationality.

== 16th to 18th centuries ==
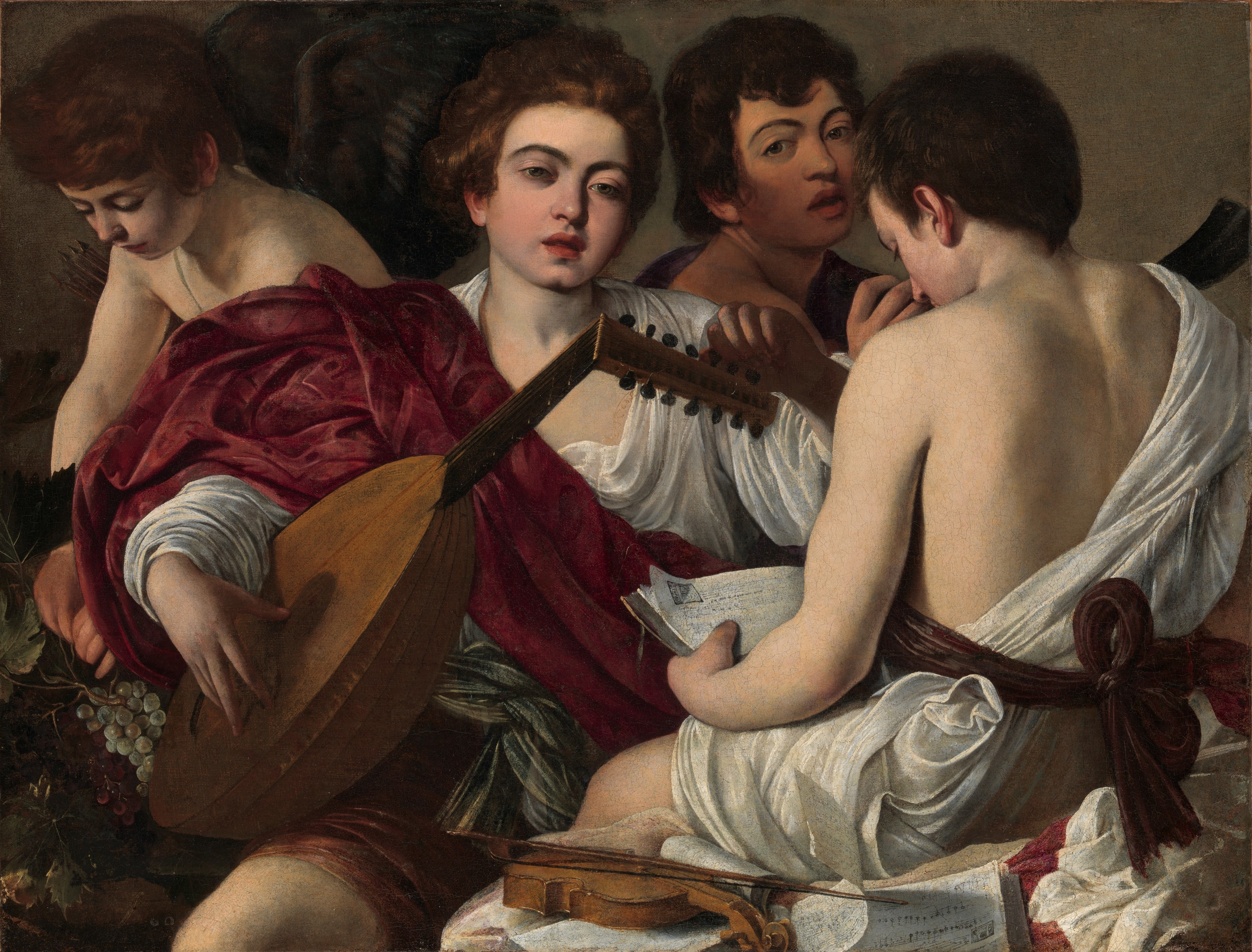
The Musicians by Caravaggio

The Italian Wars saw 65 years of French attacks on the Italian states, starting with Charles VIII's invasion of Naples in 1494. However the Peace of Cateau-Cambrésis (1559) saw about half of Italy (the south and Milan) fall under the rule of the Spanish Habsburgs. They would be replaced by the Austrian Habsburgs with the War of the Spanish Succession in 1700. The Council of Italy in Madrid controlled the Spanish viceroyalties in Italy, while a special section of the Aulic council in Vienna was sovereign over the Imperial fiefs in Italy. Italian troops served throughout Europe for the catholic side in the age of the European Wars of Religion. They fought in Germany, in France, in Italy, the Spanish Netherlands, in North Africa, on the fleet—on the Invincible Armada (1588), too—and in Central and South America, with very good results. The War of the Spanish Succession saw control of much of Naples and Sicily pass from Spain to Austria, with the Treaty of Utrecht of 1713. However, the Spaniards regained Naples and Sicily following the Battle of Bitonto in 1738.

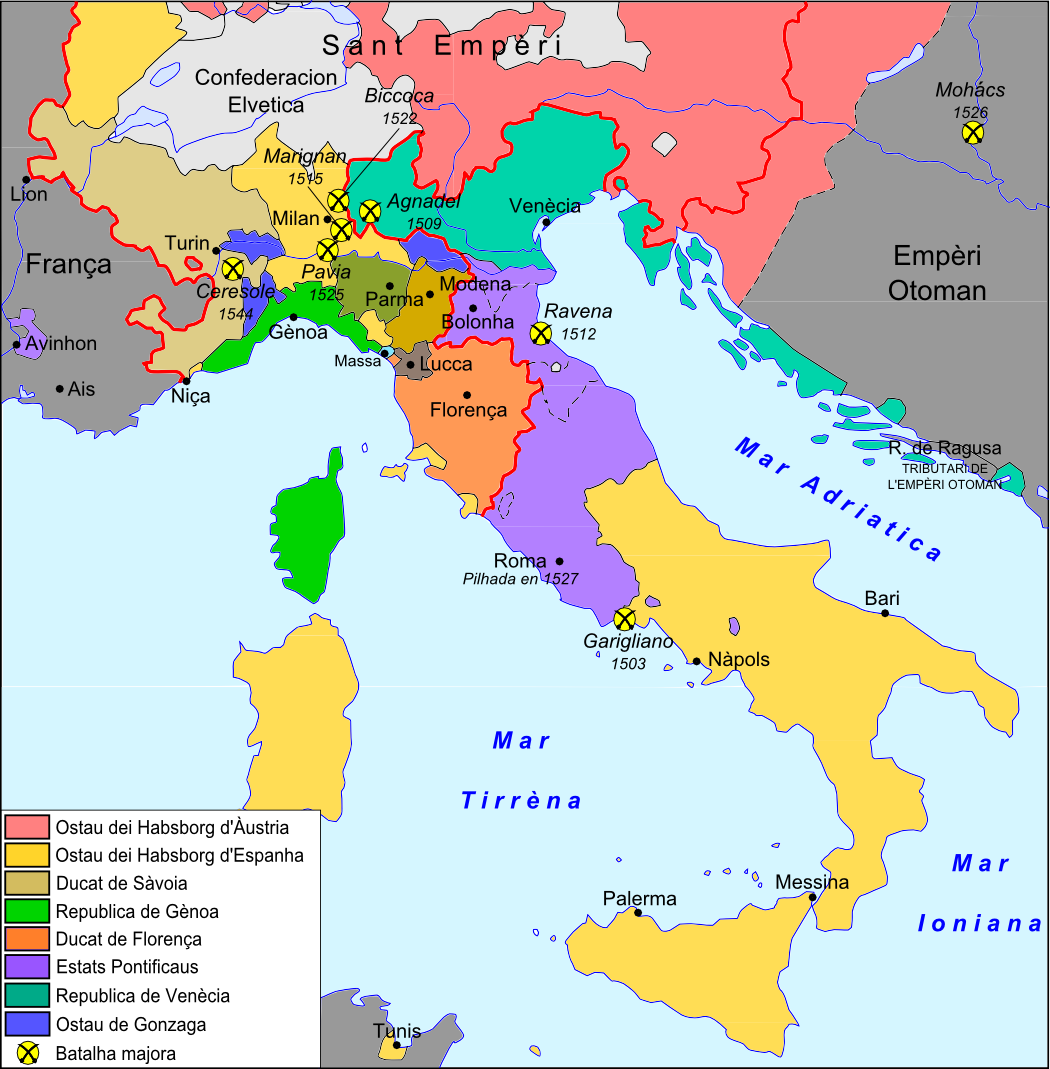
Map of Italy in 1559 after the Peace of Cateau-Cambrésis

Spanish and Austrian hegemony was not always based on direct rule; states such as Venice, Genoa, the Papal States, the duchies of Este, and Duchy of Savoy, were the only independent states, while a large part of the rest of Italy relied on the protection of Spain or Austria against external aggression. Furthermore, those areas under direct Spanish and (later) Austrian control were theoretically independent principalities bound to Spain and Austria through personal unions alone.

Italy began to experience an economic and social decline as the 16th century progressed. The Age of Discovery had shifted the center of trade in Europe from the Mediterranean to the Atlantic, and so the Italian states lost much of their previous importance. Venice continued to fight bitterly with the Ottoman Empire for control of outposts in the eastern Mediterranean. It participated in the great naval Battle of Lepanto in 1571, and in the following century battled the Turks in the Cretan War, when it gained control of the Peloponnese in Greece but lost Crete, Venice's largest and richest overseas possession. Venice experienced one last great martial triumph by helping to defeat the Ottoman Empire in the war of 1683–1699. By the 18th century, economic activity dwindled as the city withdrew in on itself and fell into stagnation, becoming easy pickings for the French revolutionary armies in 1796.

The Papal States also lost much of their former power as the Protestant Reformation divided Europe into two camps. The remaining Catholic princes increasingly sought to be the masters in their own houses and often clashed with the papacy over jurdistrictional matters. During the unceasing rivalry between France and Spain, Europe's two great Catholic powers, the popes often acted as mediators. Relations with Paris deteriorated sharply during the reign of Louis XIV, until he and the papacy found common ground in suppressing Jansenism. Even in Italy itself, the political importance of the Papal States declined. The Counter-Reformation popes largely concerned themselves with religious matters and church reform, and so had little time for politics. They worked to fight brigandage, long endemic in the Papal States, reformed the court system, and embellished Rome with many buildings. Gregory XIII introduced the calendar that bears his name, and the papal fleet participated in the Battle of Lepanto. In addition to its loss of political power, the Church came under increasing attack during the Age of Enlightenment in the 18th century.

As Spain declined in the 16th century, so did its Italian possessions in Naples, Sicily, Sardinia, and Milan. Southern Italy was impoverished, stagnant, and cut off from the mainstream of events in Europe. Naples was one of the continent's most overcrowded and unsanitary cities, with a crime-ridden and volatile populace. The Neapolitan aristocracy long resented Spanish rule and welcomed the arrival of the Austrians in 1707. However, they were disappointed as Vienna continued the practice of not allowing any autonomy to Naples. While the war raged, Austria imposed huge tax burdens on the city and did not begin to provide it with any adequate administration until peace returned. Graf von Daun (viceroy of Naples from 1713 to 1719) attempted several reforms, but came into dispute with the church over jurisdictional matters. He largely succeeded in making peace with Rome, but international strife caused the Austrian emperors to impose more taxes on Naples and neglect all but the city's traditional feudal lords. Cardinal Michael Friedrich von Althann next became viceroy (1722–1728), but upset the nobility (already reeling from imperial taxes) and the middle class with his pro-clerical stance. Althann's downfall came by attempting to establish a state bank (the Banco di San Carlo) with the intention of acquiring crown lands for the Austrian emperor. He infuriated both the nobility and middle class with this ill-conceived campaign, and after his expulsion Naples suffered several tumultuous years of famine and social unrest, with international problems preventing any attempt at administrative reform. It was with relief that the Spanish born Don Carlos ascended the throne of a reborn Kingdom of Naples in 1734. In 1759, he left to become King Charles III of Spain and was succeeded by his son Ferdinand, who was underage and so government was left to the regent Bernardo Tanucci. In the spirit of the Enlightenment, Tanucci attempted to establish a benevolent despotism by a series of reforms and weakening the power of traditional Neapolitan institutions. Ferdinand came of age in 1767, but had little interest in government and was largely dominated by his wife the Archduchess Maria Carolina, who disliked Tanucci's pro-Spanish stance and managed to replace him with Sir John Acton, an English emigre. When the French Revolution erupted, they allied with Austria and Britain against France.

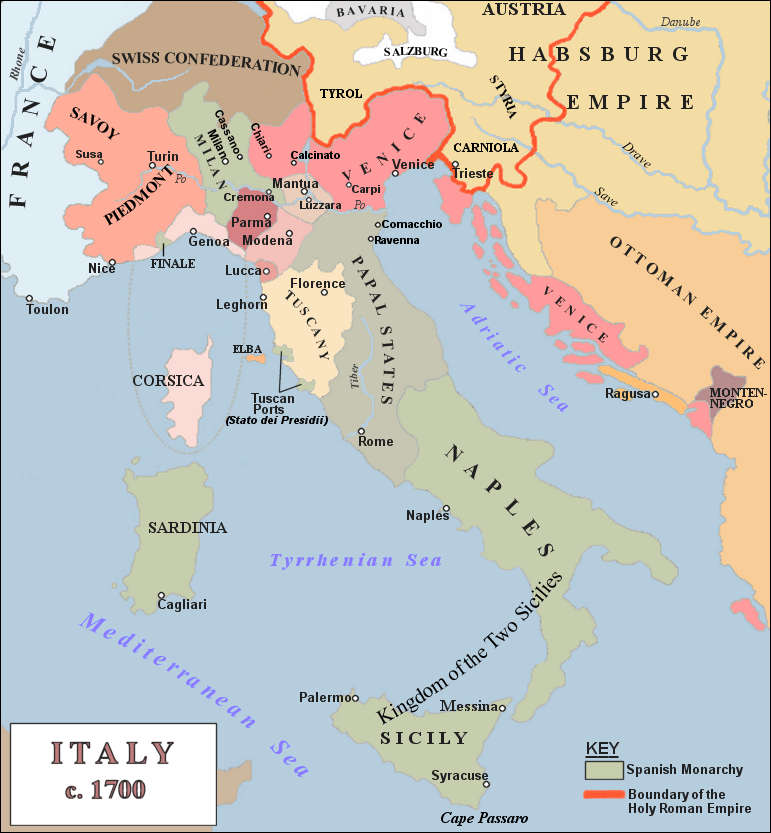
Map of Italy at the beginning of the 18th century

Sicily on the other hand experienced peaceful relations with Madrid, as the Spanish largely allowed the island to manage its own affairs. Since it was an important outpost in the Mediterranean as well as a significant trading partner of Spain, friendly ties were valued. After Sicily passed under Austrian rule in 1720, trouble erupted as Vienna stationed permanent garrisons of German-born troops on the island, provoking frequent and violent confrontations with the local populace. The corruption and backwardness of Sicilian society made it difficult to establish a working government, and much like Naples Sicily was forced to pay massive taxes and tribute to Vienna.

However, Emperor Charles VI attempted to build up Sicily's economy by turning Messina and other locations into important ports so as to attract foreign commerce, as well as shore up the island's failing grain and silk industries. But the emperor could not offset an economic downturn that was beyond his control, and many of his projects proved unfeasible, ultimately causing a near-total economic meltdown.

Charles had a tricky religious situation in Sicily where the king traditionally served as apostolic legate, which he sought to maintain at all costs while also promising to defend the Catholic faith. He and his ministers successfully debated the legateship with the popes and made peace with the Vatican. In the end however, Austrian rule made little lasting impact on Sicily and Spanish troops took possession of the island in 1734.

Sardinia also was left to itself and many Spaniards settled on the island, which had an economy mostly based on sheepherding and which had little contact with the rest of Italy. Corsica passed from the Republic of Genoa to France in 1769 after the Treaty of Versailles. Italian was the official language of Corsica until 1859.

== Age of Enlightenment ==
The Enlightenment played a distinctive, if small, role in 18th century Italy, 1685–1789. Although large parts of Italy were controlled by conservative Habsburgs or the pope, Tuscany had some opportunities for reform. Leopold II of Tuscany abolished the death penalty in Tuscany and reduced censorship. From Naples Antonio Genovesi (1713–69) influenced a generation of southern Italian intellectuals and University students. His textbook "Diceosina, o Sia della Filosofia del Giusto e dell'Onesto" (1766) was a controversial attempt to mediate between the history of moral philosophy, on the one hand, and the specific problems encountered by 18th-century commercial society, on the other. It contained the greater part of Genovesi's political, philosophical, and economic thought – guidebook for Neapolitan economic and social development. Science flourished as Alessandro Volta and Luigi Galvani made break-through discoveries in electricity. Pietro Verri was a leading economist in Lombardy. Historian Joseph Schumpeter states he was ‘the most important pre-Smithian authority on Cheapness-and-Plenty’. The most influential scholar on the Italian Enlightenment has been Franco Venturi.

== Italy in the Napoleonic era ==
Italy before the Napoleonic invasion (1796).

At the end of the 18th century, Italy was almost in the same political conditions as in the 16th century; the main differences were that Austria had replaced Spain as the dominant foreign power after the War of Spanish Succession (and that too was not true with regards to Naples and Sicily), and that the dukes of Savoy (a mountainous region between Italy and France) had become kings of Sardinia by increasing their Italian possessions, which now included Sardinia and the north-western region of Piedmont.

The French Revolution had attracted considerable attention in Italy since its beginning, inasmuch as the reform attempts of enlightened despots throughout the 18th century proved largely abortive. Masonic lodges sprang up in large numbers during this period where radical changes were discussed by the intelligentsia, away from the clumsy efforts mentioned above.

Predictably, the establishment in Italy was totally hostile to the ideas coming out of France and harsh crackdowns were launched on dissent. As early as 1792, French armies had penetrated Italian soil, and that same year, the impoverished Piedmontese peasants warned their king that he might too face justice as had happened to Louis XVI in France. The middle class in Rome revolted against the Vatican's political power, and their counterparts in Venice along with the nobility denounced that city's government.

However, most of these protests accomplished little outside of Piedmont and Naples, and in the south a conspiracy hatched by pro-republican Freemasons was discovered and the ringleaders executed. Dozens of dissenters fled to France in the aftermath of the trials. One of these dissenters, Filippo Buonarroti, a member of an ancient Tuscan noble family, returned to Italy along with the French armies and briefly set up a revolutionary government in the Ligurian town of Oneglia. The privileges of the nobility were abolished and the Church establishment replaced by a universalist cult of the Supreme Being. But after Robespierre (whom Bonouarti modeled his government on) fell from power in France, he was summoned back home and his experiment quickly ended.

This situation was shaken in 1796, when the French Army of Italy under Napoleon invaded Italy, with the aims of forcing the First Coalition to abandon Sardinia (where they had created an anti-revolutionary puppet-ruler) and forcing Austria to withdraw from Italy. The first battles came on April 9 between the French and the Piedmontese and within only two weeks Victor Amadeus III of Sardinia was forced to sign an armistice. On May 15 the French general then entered Milan, where he was welcomed as a liberator. Subsequently, beating off Austrian counterattacks and continuing to advance, he arrived in the Veneto in 1797. Here occurred the Veronese Easters, an act of rebellion against French oppression, that tied down Napoleon for about a week.

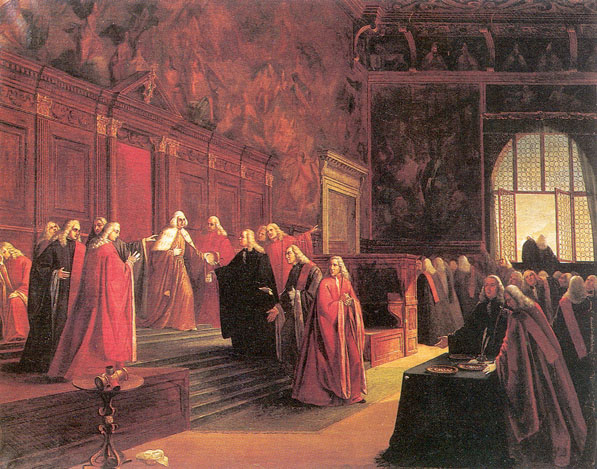
A portrait painting the fall of the Republic of Venice (1797): the abdication of the last Doge, Ludovico Manin

In October 1797 Napoleon signed the Treaty of Campo Formio, by which the Republic of Venice was annexed to the Austrian state, dashing Italian nationalists' hopes that it might become an independent state. This treaty gave Austrian recognition to the existence of the Cisalpine Republic (made up of Lombardy, Emilia-Romagna and small parts of Tuscany and Veneto), and annexed Piedmont to France. Even if, like the other states created by the invasion, the Cisalpine Republic was just a satellite of France, these satellites sparked a nationalist movement. The Cisalpine Republic was converted into the Italian Republic in 1802, under the presidency of Napoleon. As all of these republics were imposed by an outside force, none had any popular support in Italy, especially since the peasantry was alienated by Jacobin anti-clericalism. It would take a true grassroots movement to bring change. In addition, even native republicans became disillusioned when they realized that the French expected them to be obedient satellites of Paris, which included frequent interference in local affairs and massive taxes. Return to the old feudal order was however equally undesirable, and so the republican movement would gradually establish its goals as nationalism and a unified Italian state.

After the War of the First Coalition ended, French aggression in Italy continued unabated, and in 1798 they occupied Rome, sent the Pope into exile, and set up a republic there. When Napoleon left for Egypt, King Ferdinand VI of Sicily retook Rome and reinstated the papacy. But almost as soon as his armies departed, the French returned and occupied Naples. Ferdinand's court was taken into exile by a British fleet. Another republic was set up (the Parthenopean) which governed in a more radical and democratic fashion than the others. But Ferdinand skillfully organized a counterrevolt led by his agent Cardinal Fabrizio Ruffo, who landed in Italy and rallied a peasant mob, which then retook Naples and proceeded to pillage and destroy the manor homes of the hated nobility. There were also mass murders of bourgeois who had supported the French. Afterwards, Ferdinand returned to his capital in triumph. 100 revolutionary leaders were summarily tried and executed.

In northern Italy, the French occupied Tuscany during the spring of 1799 until another peasant uprising drove them out. Jews and suspected Jacobins were lynched en masse by the mob, and the nobility and Church quickly regained power. That fall, the Roman Republic also collapsed and the French were by now virtually cleared from Italy.

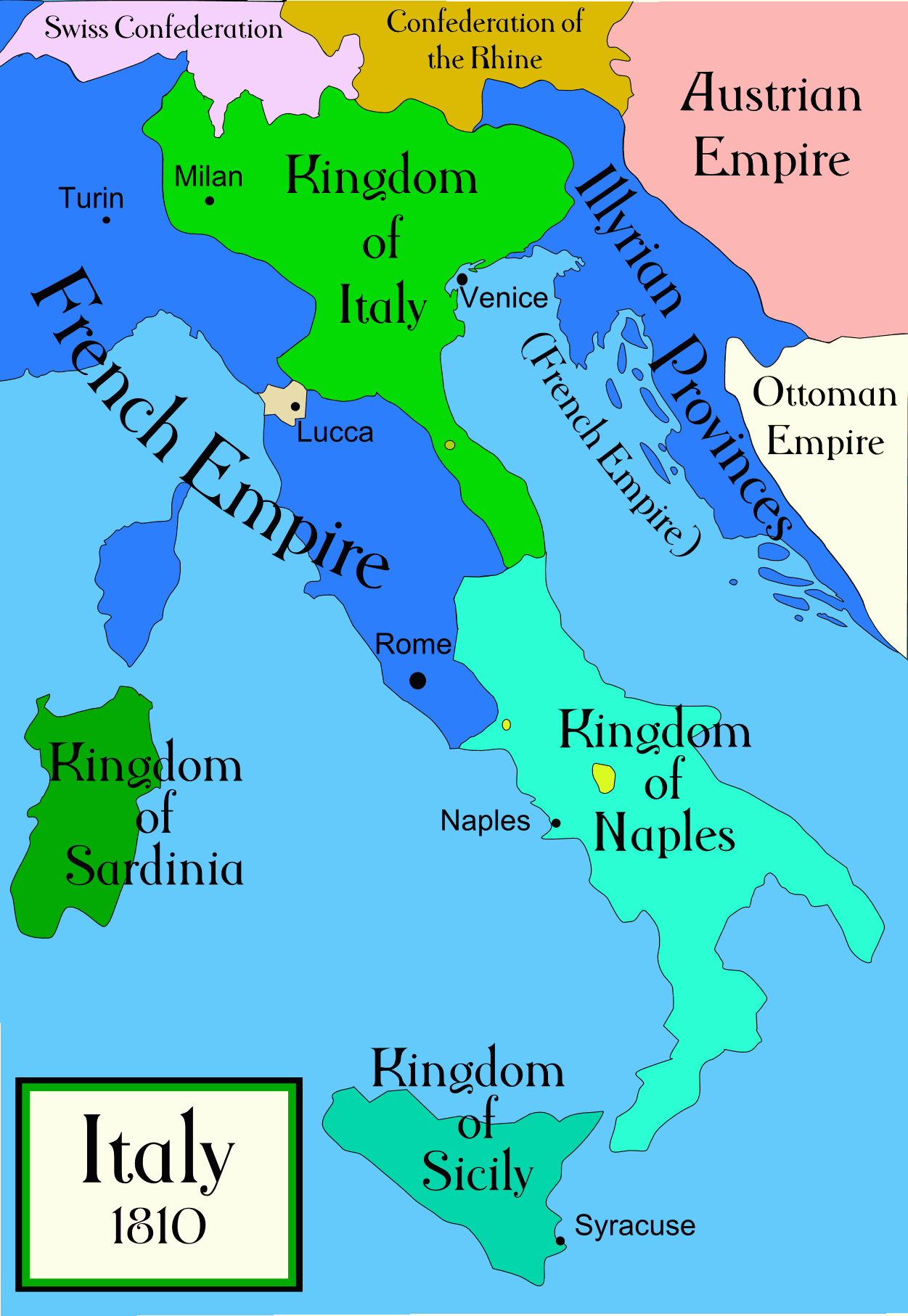
Political map of Italy in the years around 1810

After seizing power as consul in France, Napoleon launched a renewed invasion of Italy. Milan fell on June 2, 1800 and Austrian defeats there and in Germany ended the War of the Second Coalition. Austria retained only control of Venetia, while France dominated the whole rest of northern Italy, leaving only the weak papal and Neapolitan states in the south. Napoleon over the next few years coalesced his Italian possessions into a single Republic of Italy, ruled by one Francesco Melzi d'Eril. But in 1805, he decided to convert the republic into a kingdom ruled by his stepson Eugene D'Beauharnais. The Kingdom of Italy was gradually expanded as Austria relinquished Venetia in 1806 and other bits of territory were added. Still other Italian regions were annexed directly into France. In 1809, the French reoccupied Rome and took Pope Pius VII prisoner.

Ferdinand VI's dominions in southern Italy remained independent for the first few years of the 19th century, but they were too weak to resist a concerted attack, and a French army swiftly occupied Naples in early 1806. Ferdinand's court fled to Sicily where they enjoyed British protection. Napoleon appointed his brother Joachim as king of Naples, but he governed only the mainland as Sicily and Sardinia remained outside of French control. During the years of Bourbon exile in Sicily, the British came to exercise political control over the island and forced Ferdinand to impose several democratic reforms. But when the Napoleonic Wars ended in 1815 and the king returned to Naples, he resumed governing as an absolute monarch.

Joachim Bonaparte meanwhile pursued an independent policy from France, instituting several reforms that strengthened the middle class in Naples. However, he along with the rest of Napoleon's satellite rulers fell from power in 1814–15.

In 1805, after the French victory over the Third Coalition and the Peace of Pressburg, Napoleon recovered Veneto and Dalmatia, annexing them to the Italian Republic and renaming it the Kingdom of Italy. Also that year a second satellite state, the Ligurian Republic (successor to the old Republic of Genoa), was pressured into merging with France. In 1806, he conquered the Kingdom of Naples and granted it to his brother and then (from 1808) to Joachim Murat, along with marrying his sisters Elisa and Paolina off to the princes of Massa-Carrara and Guastalla. In 1808, he also annexed Marche and Tuscany to the Kingdom of Italy.

In 1809, Bonaparte occupied Rome, and conflicted with the pope, who had excommunicated him. To maintain the efficiency of the state he exiled the Pope first to Savona and then to France, and taking the Papal States' art collections back to the Louvre. The conquest of Russia that Napoleon undertook in 1811 marked the end of the apogee of Italians' support for Napoleon, because many Italians died in this failed campaign.

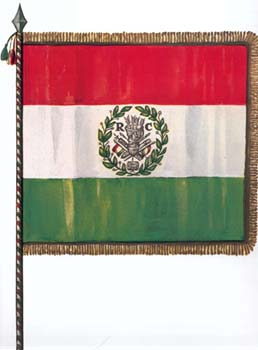
Flag of the Cispadane Republic, which was the first Italian tricolour adopted by a sovereign Italian state (1797)

After Russia, other states of Europe re-allied themselves and defeated Napoleon at the Battle of Leipzig, after which his Italian allied states, with Murat first among them, abandoned him to ally with Austria. Defeated at Paris on April 6, 1814, Napoleon was compelled to renounce his throne and sent into exile on Elba. The resulting Congress of Vienna (1814) restored a situation close to that of 1795, dividing Italy between Austria (in the north-east and Lombardy), the Kingdom of Sardinia, the Kingdom of the Two Sicilies (in the south and in Sicily), and Tuscany, the Papal States and other minor states in the centre. However, old republics such as Venice and Genoa were not recreated, Venice went to Austria, and Genoa went to the Kingdom of Sardinia.

On Napoleon's escape and return to France (the Hundred Days), he regained Murat's support, but Murat proved unable to convince the Italians to fight for Napoleon with his Proclamation of Rimini and was beaten and killed. The Italian kingdoms thus fell, and Italy's Restoration period began, with many pre-Napoleonic sovereigns returned to their thrones. Piedmont, Genoa and Nice came to be united, as did Sardinia (which went on to create the State of Savoy), while Lombardy, Veneto, Istria and Dalmatia were re-annexed to Austria. The dukedoms of Parma and Modena re-formed, and the Papal States and the Kingdom of Naples returned to the Bourbons. The political and social events in the restoration period of Italy (1815–1835) led to popular uprisings throughout the peninsula and greatly shaped what would become the Italian Wars of Independence. All this led to a new Kingdom of Italy and Italian unification.

During the Napoleonic era, in 1797, the first official adoption of the Italian tricolour as a national flag by a sovereign Italian state, the Cispadane Republic, a Napoleonic sister republic of Revolutionary France, took place, on the basis of the events following the French Revolution (1789–1799) which, among its ideals, advocated the national self-determination. This event is celebrated by the Tricolour Day. The Italian national colours appeared for the first time on a tricolour cockade in 1789, anticipating by seven years the first green, white and red Italian military war flag, which was adopted by the Lombard Legion in 1796.

== Aftermath ==
Animated map of the Italian unification from 1829 to 1871

With the fall of Napoleon (1814) and the restoration of the absolutist monarchical regimes, the Italian tricolour went underground, becoming the symbol of the patriotic ferments that began to spread in Italy and the symbol which united all the efforts of the Italian people towards freedom and independence.

Between 1820 and 1861, a sequence of events led to the independence and unification of Italy (except for Veneto and the province of Mantua, Lazio, Trentino-Alto Adige, Friuli and Julian March, known as Italia irredenta, which were united with the rest of Italy in 1866 after the Third Italian War of Independence, in 1870 after the capture of Rome, and in 1918 after the First World War respectively); this period of Italian history is known as the Risorgimento. The Italian tricolour waved for the first time in the history of the Risorgimento on 11 March 1821 in the Cittadella of Alessandria, during the revolutions of 1820s, after the oblivion caused by the restoration of the absolutist monarchical regimes.

== See also ==
- Sister republic
- 130 departments of the First French Empire (including former Italian territories annexed by the First French Empire)
- List of historic states of Italy
- King of Italy (including the list of the modern kings of Italy)
