= Siege of Capua (1734) =

1734 siege

Coordinates: 41°06′N 14°12′E

- Part of the War of the Polish Succession
Date	April – 30 November 1734
Location	Capua, Kingdom of Naples (present-day southern Italy)
Result	Spanish victory

Belligerents
Spain	Habsburg Monarchy

Commanders and leaders
Count Marsillac; James Fitz-James Stuart, 2nd Duke of Berwick	Otto Ferdinand von Abensberg und Traun

Strength
6,000–16,000 men	6,000

Casualties and losses
Unknown	1,000

The siege of Capua was the last major military action of the War of the Polish Succession in the Kingdom of Naples. Austrian forces of the Habsburg monarchy, under the command of the Austrian Marshal Otto Ferdinand von Abensberg und Traun, withstood for seven months a blockade begun in April 1734 by Spanish and French forces under Count Marsillac. General Traun surrendered the fortress of Capua in November 1734 with full honors of war, primarily because of exhausted provisions and ammunition, but also because it was clear no relief was coming to the isolated garrison.

== Background ==
Following the outbreak of the War of the Polish Succession in the fall of 1733, and news that Bourbon allies France and Spain were planning operations against the kingdoms of Naples and Sicily, Habsburg military and political leaders began planning the defense of Naples against the expected invasion. Hampered by a lack of resources, Marshal Otto Ferdinand von Abensberg und Traun and the Count of Caraffa disagreed on how to best defend Naples. Caraffa wanted to minimally garrison the country's fortresses and concentrate Austrian forces into a single army that could either avoid or force confrontation with the Spanish, while Traun, whose opinion prevailed, wanted to strongly garrison the fortresses and force the Spanish to besiege them.

Major garrisons were placed at Pescara and Gaeta, and Traun himself took command of 3,500 men and occupied the fortress at Capua, near the northwestern border between the kingdom and the Papal States. Caraffa was responsible for the defense of the city of Naples and the safety of the Austrian viceroy Giulio Visconti Borromeo Arese.

== Prelude ==
The army of Charles of Parma, numbering about 21,000, marched south from Tuscany where it had been assembled, and reached the northern border of Naples on 28 March 1734. Traun had taken most of the Capua garrison, and constructed a fortified line at Mignano, at which he expected conflict with the Spanish forces. However, on 30 March, the Spanish, aided by sympathetic locals, sent 4,000 troops through narrow mountain passes, threatening to flank Traun's position. When Traun learned of this, he ordered a precipitous retreat to Capua, abandoning armaments and camp equipment along the way. The Spanish then proceeded southward toward Naples, bypassing Capua, and entered the city on 10 May after securing the surrender of its fortresses. About 6,000 troops were stationed to blockade Capua cutting off its communications and access to the land for provisions.

While Charles' army was marching south, a Spanish fleet had landed forces on the islands of Ischia and Procida in the Bay of Naples. Austrian garrisons from these islands had been brought to the mainland, where they joined the garrison at Capua (before it was blockaded), raising the size of Traun's garrison to about 6,000. The Austrians were hoping to be relieved by the forces of Florimund Mercy in northern Italy, but these were occupied with the Franco-Sardinian army.

Following the destruction of the Austrian army at Bitonto in May, Spanish forces turned to besiege the three remaining Austrian outposts: Pescara, Gaeta, and Capua. Pescara was the first to surrender, on 29 July, with Gaeta surrendering in August. Charles was then able to detach troops for the conquest of Sicily, and focus the remaining troops on Capua.

== Defenses ==
The fortress of Capua was a substantial construction, although it had not been maintained well in the years immediately preceding this conflict. It had numerous weaknesses, the principle of which were:

- The water supply;
- The poorly-bastioned Naples gate;
- The landscape to the south and west, which was dotted with groves of olive and fruit trees.

The garrison, under the command of Marshal Traun, consisted of 6,000 men, including 10 battalions of infantry from the regiments of Heister, Göldlin, O'Nelly, Carl Lothringen, and Schmettau, 6 grenadier companies, and companies of horseless cuirassiers from the regiments of Pignatelli and Kokoržowa.

Traun may also have benefited from a long-standing friendship with Count Marsillac, the commander of the besieging forces. The two had fought together in previous campaigns, and even shared the same tent on occasion.

== Siege ==
While the Austrians had intended to provision the fort sufficient to keep a garrison of 5,000 for five months, the supplies present in April were only sufficient to keep the garrison for two months. Traun organized a corps of volunteers that engaged in foraging operations during the months of the blockade. Their forays were successful enough that in mid-July the Austrians still had one month's supplies. His prospects for relief, however, were dampened by news that Marshal Mercy had died in the Austrian defeat at Parma and that the Austrians had retreated afterwards.

On 10 August Traun launched an elaborate sortie against the Spanish blockade, which had grown to over 15,000 men. In addition to raiding Spanish supplies, he targeted a boat bridge the Spanish had set up across the Volturno River. Sending several battalions out the Naples and Rome gates in the middle of the night, they spent several hours attempting to reach and destroy the bridge. The Spanish were able to fend off the attacks, but they were only cover for the true operation, in which a picked company of 500 successfully raided the countryside. Around dawn, this force returned with 150 cows, 90 water buffalo, 1,000 sheep. The attempt on the bridge had cost the Austrians over 300 casualties, although they killed more than 350 Spanish and took 52 prisoners (who Traun promptly released).

The siege continued into November, and conditions in the blockaded city became progressively more severe. On 20 November Traun and the Spanish command reached an agreement that Traun would capitulate if relief had not arrived by 30 November. On that day, the Austrian garrison, reduced to about 5,000 men, marched out with the full honors of war, including two field pieces, and boarded Spanish ships to be transported to Triest and Fiume. The only term of the surrender that the Spanish denied was permission for the troops to assist in the northern Italian campaign.
