= Giuseppe Palmieri =

Giuseppe Palmieri may refer to:

- Giuseppe Palmieri (athlete) (1902-1989), Italian high jumper and javelin thrower
- Giuseppe Palmieri (economist) (1721–1793), Italian economist and politician of the 18th century
- Giuseppe Palmieri (painter), (1674-1740), Italian painter of the late Baroque period
