= Antonio Genovesi =

Italian philosopher

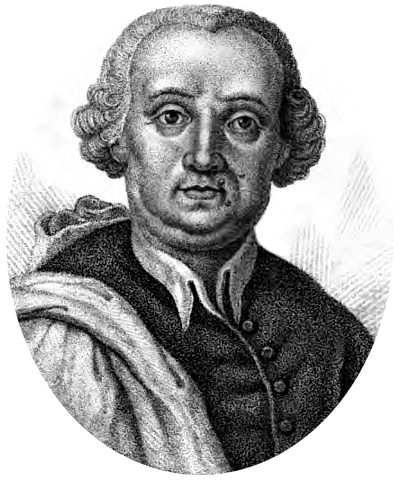
- Born: 1 November 1713; Castiglione del Genovesi, Kingdom of Naples
- Died: 22 September 1769 (aged 55); Naples, Kingdom of Naples

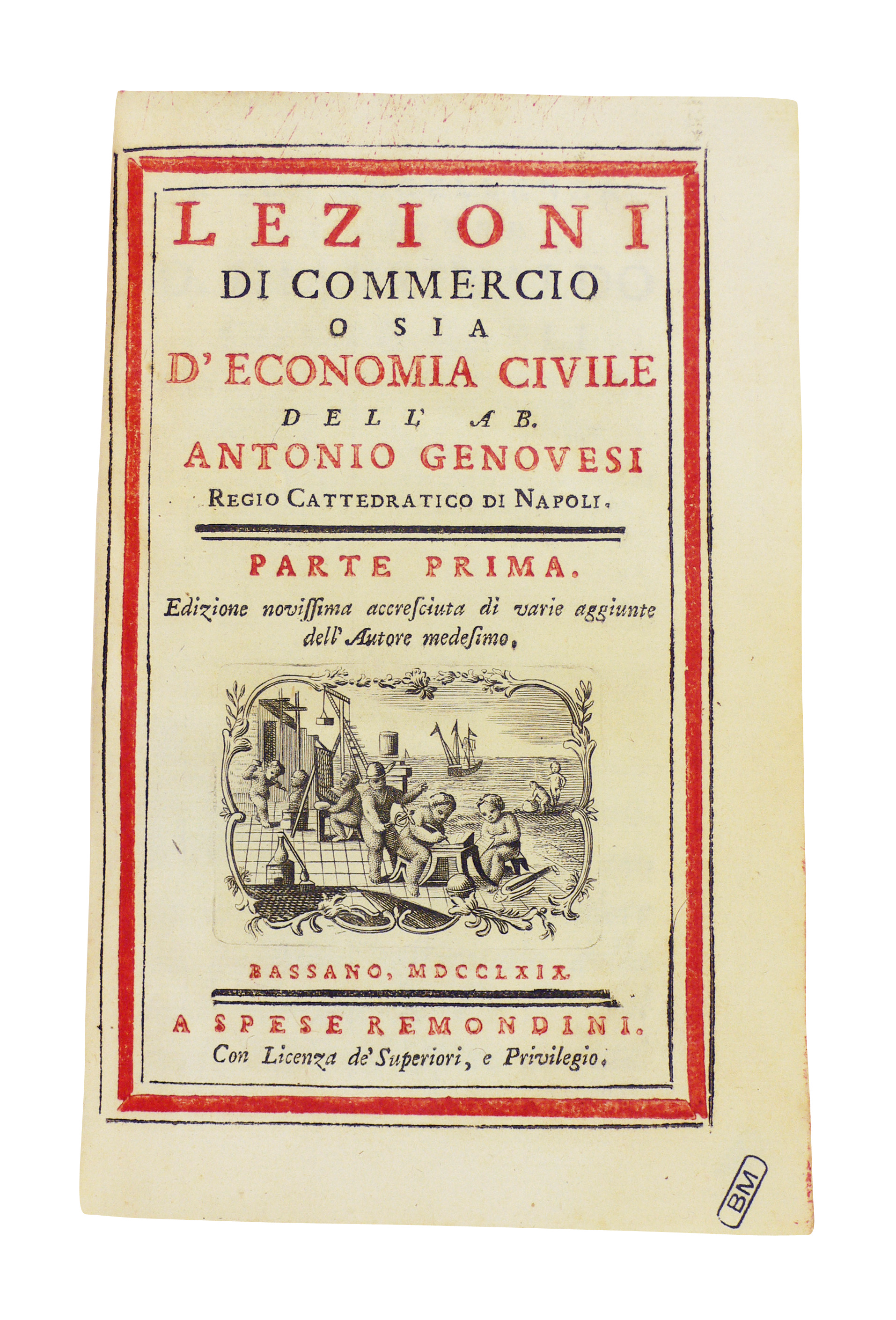
Lezioni di commercio, 1769

Antonio Genovesi (1 November 1713 – 22 September 1769) was an Italian writer, philosopher and political economist.

== Biography ==
Son of Salvatore Genovese, a shoemaker, and Adriana Alfinito of San Mango, Antonio Genovesi was born in Castiglione, near Salerno in 1713. He began studying early on under the direction of his father and, at fourteen, under Niccolò Genovesi, a relative, and young doctor from Naples, who taught Antonio peripatetic philosophy for two years, and Cartesian philosophy for another year. When he was eighteen, during his theological studies, he fell in love with a girl from Castiglione, Angela Dragone. His father didn't approve of the couple, and sent his son to a convent of Augustinian monks in Buccino, home of some of his relatives. Here he continued his theological and philosophical studies under the priest Giovanni Abbamonte, focusing his interest on Latin and Greek.

After passing his exam in dogmatic theology, he was ordained deacon on 22 December 1736 in the Cathedral of Salerno, with the attendance of archbishop of Salerno, Fabrizio di Capua. In 1738, Antonio Genovesi, at 25, was ordained a priest.

After a few months, he moved to Naples, where he met and befriended Giambattista Vico. In 1741, he was granted a chair in metaphysics—in later conjunction with the chair of Ethics—at the Naples University. At this prestigious university, he also was granted the Economics chair, in 1755, the first one of this kind in Italy (the name was originally "Commerce and Mechanics"). At this time, he published the "Lessons in Commerce", in which he declared himself favorable to a more incisive free-trade policy. Among his students were Giuseppe Palmieri and Francesco Mario Pagano.

He was a scholar in classical Literature, theology and metaphysical sciences. Later in his life, nonetheless, he started to disdain his old theoretical culture, substituting it gradually with a study focused on practical aims. A follower of Vico's thought, and even more of Locke's, at least regarding his philosophy, Genovesi managed to keep his minister's functions only due to the intervention of the archbishop of Taranto, Celestino Galiani, and of Pope Benedict XIV himself.

He died in Naples on September 22, 1769. His body was buried in the church of the monastery of Sant'Eramo Nuovo, thanks to his friend Raimondo di Sangro, prince of San Severo. He was simply placed in the crypt, and therefore we have no specific tomb. Due to renovations in the early 1930s, the remains contained in the crypt (and those of Genovesi) were transferred to the church of Sant'Eramo Vecchio.

== Philosophical thought ==
In his works, Genovesi compromises between idealism and empirism, trying to save the essential religious values of Christian philosophy.

== Economic thought ==
Antonio Genovesi was influenced by the new Italian cultural landscape, and tried through studies and experimentation to describe the concept of public happiness, to be obtained by freeing mankind from its state of "obscurity". He understood the state of cultural, material and spiritual decadence, aftermath of the Neapolitan golden age, and felt the need to intervene in order to restore the former glory of the arts, commerce and agriculture.

This practical rethinking lead him to abandon the study of ethics and philosophy, and turn to economics. In his opinion, economics served governments in increasing their wealth and the power of nations. The chair of Political Economy was instituted specifically for him at the University of Naples by Bartolomeo Intieri. Intieri's palace of Massaquano was for long periods of time the intellectual refuge of Genovesi, where he wrote some of his works.

The core of his economic thought can be found in the Lezioni di commercio, O sia di economia civile, published in 1765, one of the first scientific treatises on Economics. Through this work, Genovesi tried to show a way for reform in some key sectors: education, agriculture (mainly large properties), government protectionism towards commerce and industry.

== Literary style ==
He chose the Italian language for his teaching, due to his passionate civil spirit: he is remembered for being the first professor not to use Latin during his courses, and for having written treatises on metaphysics and logic in Italian. His aim was to spread economic studies among the people, ideally continuing with other humanists in considering these the means to civilization.

== See also ==
- History of early modern Italy
