= Battle of Bitonto =

1734 battle of the War of the Polish Succession

Coordinates: 41°07′N 16°41′E

- Part of the War of the Polish Succession
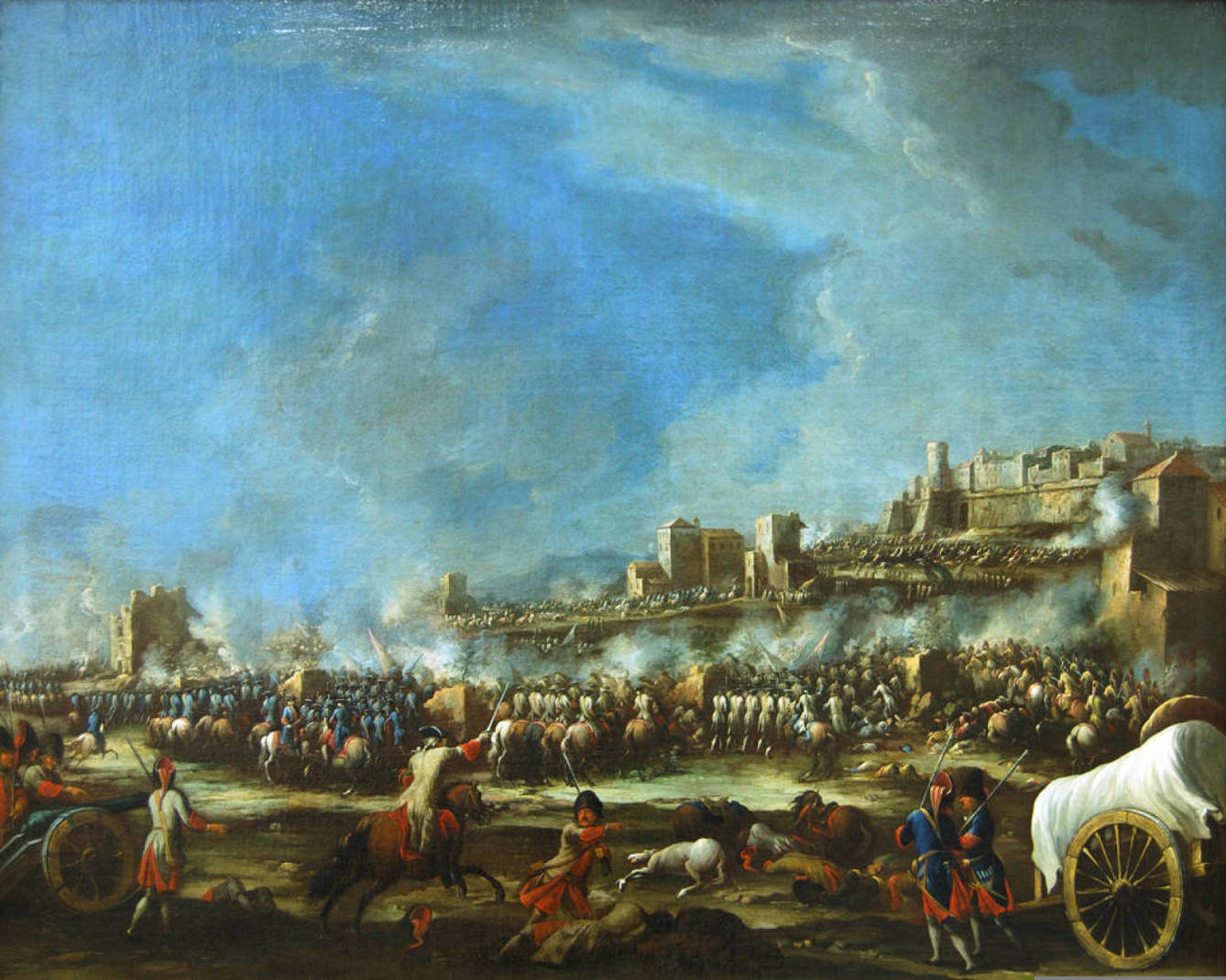
- The Battle of Bitonto by Giovanni Luigi Rocco
Date	25 May 1734
Location	near Bitonto, Kingdom of Naples (present-day southern Italy)
Result	Spanish victory

Belligerents
Spain	Austria

Commanders and leaders
(Spain) Duke of Montemar	Giuseppe Antonio, Prince of Belmonte

Strength
14,000–16,600 infantry and cavalry	8,000 infantry 2,500 cavalry or down to 6,200 in total

Casualties and losses
99 dead 196 wounded or up to 800 in total	1,000 dead 1,000 wounded 2,500 captured

The Battle of Bitonto (25 May 1734) was a Spanish victory over Austrian forces near Bitonto in the Kingdom of Naples (in southern Italy) in the War of Polish Succession. The battle ended organized Austrian resistance outside a small number of fortresses in the kingdom.

== Prelude ==
King Philip V of Spain had always aimed to reconquer Naples and Sicily, which Spain lost to the Habsburgs as a consequence of the War of the Spanish Succession. In 1714 he married Elisabeth Farnese, who had dynastic interests in Italy. Under her influence he had attempted without success to recover the Italian holdings in the War of the Quadruple Alliance. When the War of the Polish Succession broke out in 1733, he saw an opportunity to act against the Habsburgs, who had no military support among western European powers (Great Britain and the Dutch Republic opting to remain neutral), with active opposition by France and Charles Emmanuel III of Sardinia. In the fall of 1733 Spain and France signed the Treaty of the Escorial, the first of several Bourbon Family Compacts. The treaty pledged mutual protection and aid, and provided for the allies to work together for the conquest of Habsburg territories on the Italian peninsula.

The Spanish fleet under Luis de Córdova y Córdova landed a Spanish army in Genoa, which joined forces with the troops of Charles of Parma, ruler of Parma in northern Italy and the eldest son of Philip and Elisabeth. From there, 21,000 men marched unopposed through the Papal States towards Naples, where Charles entered the city virtually uncontested, and proclaimed himself king of the Two Sicilies on 7 May 1734. Austrian garrisons in the fortresses at Gaeta and Capua were blockaded by 6,000 men, and Montemar led 12,000 Spanish troops after the retreating Austrian viceroy.

The Habsburg Viceroy, Guido Visconti, first fled to Bari in Apulia before the advancing Spanish, and then fled by ship on 21 May with one of his generals, leaving Giuseppe Antonio, Prince of Belmonte in command of the Austrian forces. The retreating Austrians were reinforced by troops that arrived from the island of Sicily, and a shipload of recruits that arrived at Taranto. Belmonte, aware that the Spanish were likely to get reinforcements from their fleet, moved to Bitonto on 24 May to force an action with Montemar before that army grew even larger. Placing inexperienced troops in the town itself, he adapted low walls and two monasteries as a defensive line and awaited the Spanish. Montemar was, according to reports Belmonte received later, reinforced by 3,000 men, raising his troop count to about 14,000 experienced and well-equipped troops.

== Battle ==
When the Spanish arrived on the scene at daybreak on 25 May, Montemar lined his troops up to face the Austrians, infantry facing infantry, cavalry facing cavalry; as the Spanish cavalry significantly outnumbered the Austrian, some of them were held in reserve on the right flank. After a few feints in which the Spanish attempted to draw the Austrians out of their defenses, the attack commenced. Around 10 am the Austrian cavalry finally gave way, with most of it beginning a disorganized retreat toward Bari, followed shortly after by Belmonte. The rest of the Austrian collapsed, with some companies following the cavalry and others trying to escape to the north and into Bitonto. Defenders in the two monasteries held their ground, and those defenses were taken by storm. The garrison in the city surrendered the next day, owing to a shortage of ammunition and provisions.

== The Apparition of Mary ==
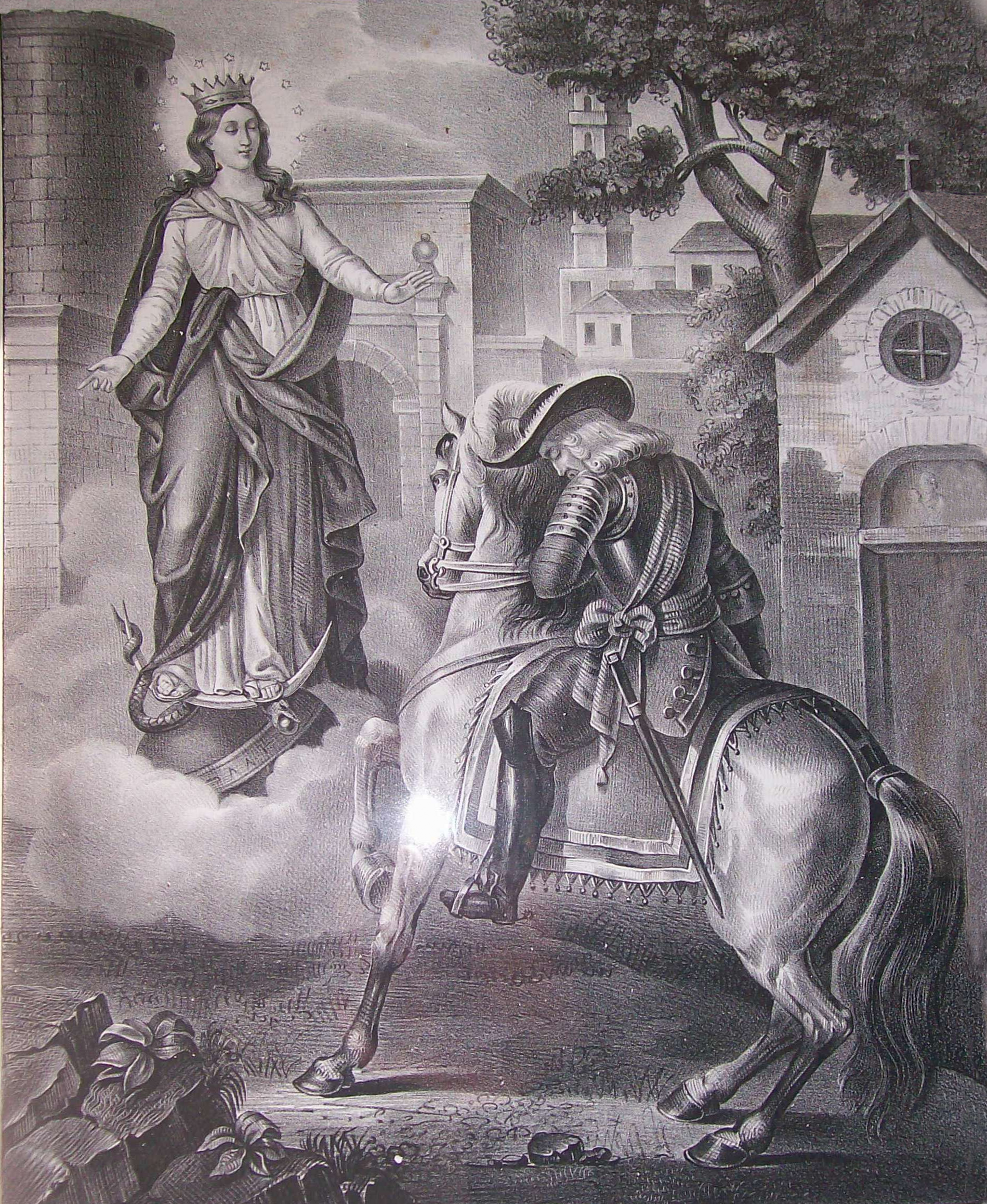
Apparition of the Virgin Mary to general Montemar

Before Montemar followed the enemy for Bari, he wanted to punish and sack the city of Bitonto for aiding the enemy forces, but according to local tradition, the Virgin Mary appeared to him and intimidated him: «Do not trespass this city, for she is the pupil of my eyes and its citizens are my children. I will defend it!». So the city was spared. The citizens of Bitonto in remembrance of the miraculous event proclaimed the Immaculate Mary patron of the city.

These events also led to fear among the population of Bari who wanted to avoid the same punishment that Bitonto had escaped, which aided the revolt against the garrisoned Austrians.

On the main gate of Bitonto now sits a statue of the Virgin Mary overlooking what was once the battlefield.

== Aftermath ==
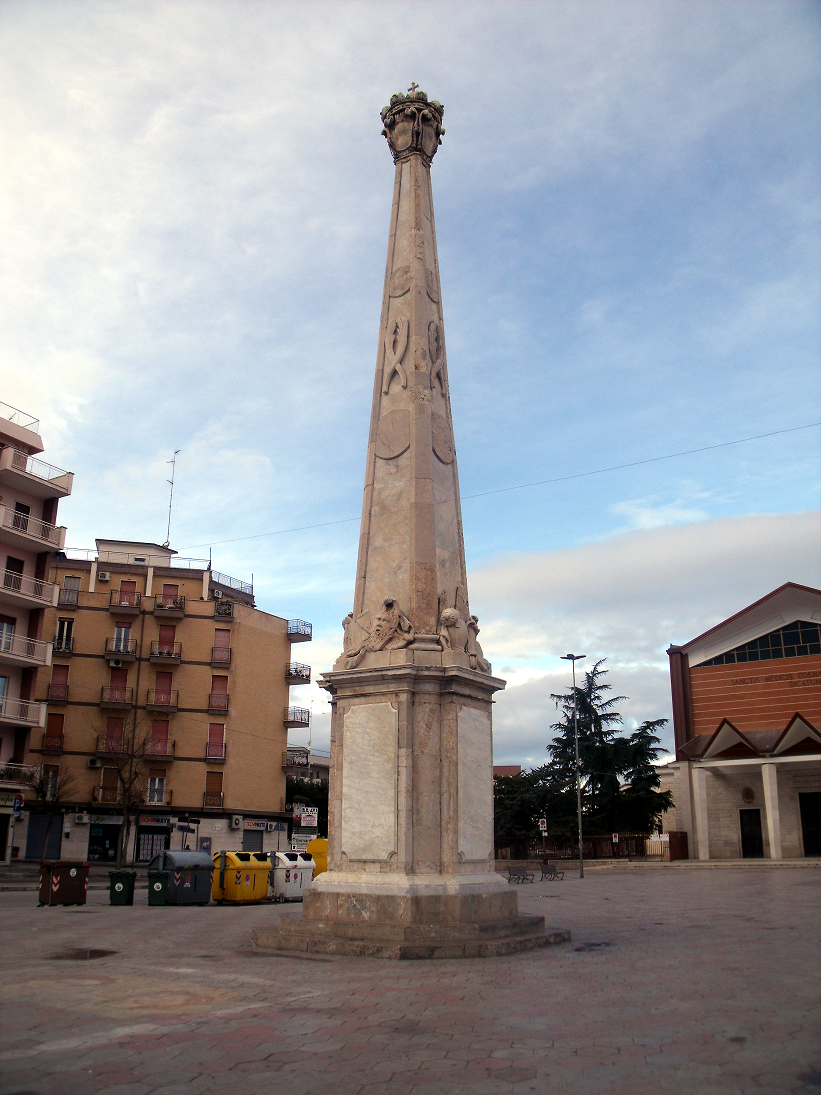
Commemorative obelisk erected on the battlefield by Giovanni Antonio de Medrano

Belmonte attempted to reorganize the remaining forces at Bari, but opposition from the local population, which was mobilizing in favor of the Spanish, made this virtually impossible. He ended up surrendering 3,800 men to the local authorities. Several hundred troops that escaped the battle to the north managed to reach Pescara, which had not yet been taken by the Spanish.

Other cities in the kingdom recognized Spanish rule, with only two Austrian-held fortresses continuing resistance until autumn. Gaeta, blockaded early in the conflict, was placed under siege and held out until August. Traun defended Capua until 30 November, when he finally surrendered; his garrison marched out with full honours of war.

The return of the Two Sicilies to Spain was confirmed by the Treaty of Vienna in 1738, which ended the war. Charles named Montemar Duke of Bitonto and commissioned Giovanni Antonio Medrano to erect an obelisk on the battlefield to commemorate the battle.
