= Traun (disambiguation) =

Traun is a city in Austria.

Traun may also refer to:

- Traun (river), a tributary to the Danube in Austria
- Traun (Alz), a tributary to the Alz river in Bavaria
- Otto Ferdinand von Abensperg und Traun (1677–1748), Austrian field marshal
- Friedrich Traun (1876–1908), German runner and tennis player
- Baron Hugo Traun, a character in the film The Angel with the Trumpet

== See also ==
- Abensberg-Traun, Austrian noble family
- Rote Traun and Weiße Traun, two rivers in Bavaria
