= Giuseppe Palmieri (economist) =

Italian economist and politician (1721–1793)

- Born: 5 May 1721; Martignano, Kingdom of Naples
- Died: 1 February 1793 (aged 71); Naples, Kingdom of Naples
- Citizenship: Italian
- Occupations: Economist, politician

Signature
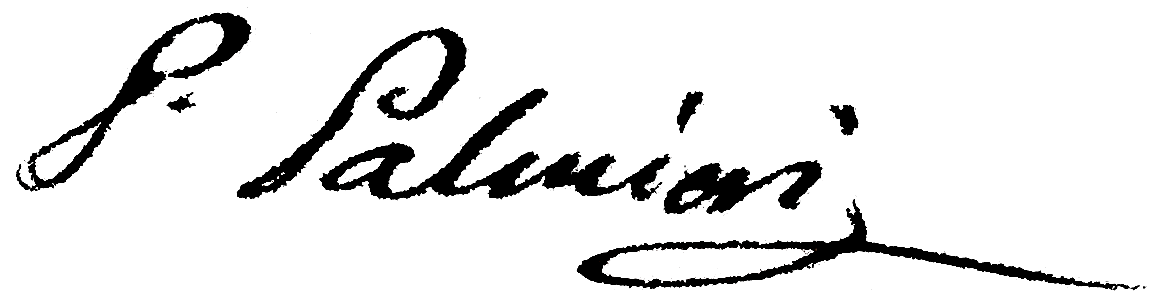

Giuseppe Palmieri (Martignano, 5 May 1721 – Naples, 1 February 1793) was an Italian economist and politician of the 18th century.

== Biography ==
Born to an aristocratic family in Martignano in Salento, then part of the Kingdom of Naples. His father was Carlo Antonio Palmieri, 3rd marquess of Martignano. He studied in Lecce before moving to Naples, where he embraced a military career in 1734. He rose to the position of lieutenant colonel. He fought the Austrians at Messina in 1734 and at the Battle of Velletri in 1744. While in Naples, he also studied philosophy and economy under Antonio Genovesi, locally one of the most important interpreters of European Age of Enlightenment writers, while also learning Latin, French and German. In 1752 he was appointed lieutenant colonel. In 1761 he published his Critical Reflexions on the Art of War, which gained him critical acclaim. The book was even praised by Frederick II, king of Prussia.

Palmieri left the army the next year to succeed his father and went back to his lands near Lecce. As a landowner, he became interested in political economy and practical means to modernize the outdated economic system of southern Italy. In 1783 he was appointed by the king as director of the customs office of the Terra d'Otranto region. In 1787 he was summoned to Naples to enter the supreme treasury council, and in 1791 he became the new Minister of Finance of the Kingdom.

During the 1780s, while conducting his political career, Palmieri published several books on economics, advocating reforms, governmental action to favour public welfare, a better redistribution of land property and the abolition of the feudal system. While in office, he worked closely with another key representative of the Neapolitan Enlightenment, Gaetano Filangieri. Giuseppe Palmieri died in Naples in 1793.

== Works ==
- Riflessioni critiche sull'arte della guerra (1761)
- Riflessioni sulla pubblica felicità relativamente al Regno di Napoli e altri scritti (1788)
- Pensieri economici (1789)
- Osservazioni sulla pubblica economia (1790)
- Della ricchezza nazionale (1792)

== Bibliography ==
- Antonio Maria Fusco, Giuseppe Palmieri e la scienza economica del tempo suo, 1979.
- Wolfgang Rother, « Giuseppe Palmieri », in Johannes Rohbeck, Wolfgang Rother (ed.): Grundriss der Geschichte der Philosophie, Die Philosophie des 18. Jahrhunderts, vol. 3: Italien. Schwabe, Basel 2011, p. 359–366 (Bibliography: p. 427).
- Franco Venturi, Nota introduttiva a Giuseppe Palmieri, in Franco Venturi (ed.), Illuministi italiani, vol. 5, Riformatori napoletani, Milan-Naples, 1962.
