= Bartolomeo Intieri =

Italian agronomist (1677–1757)

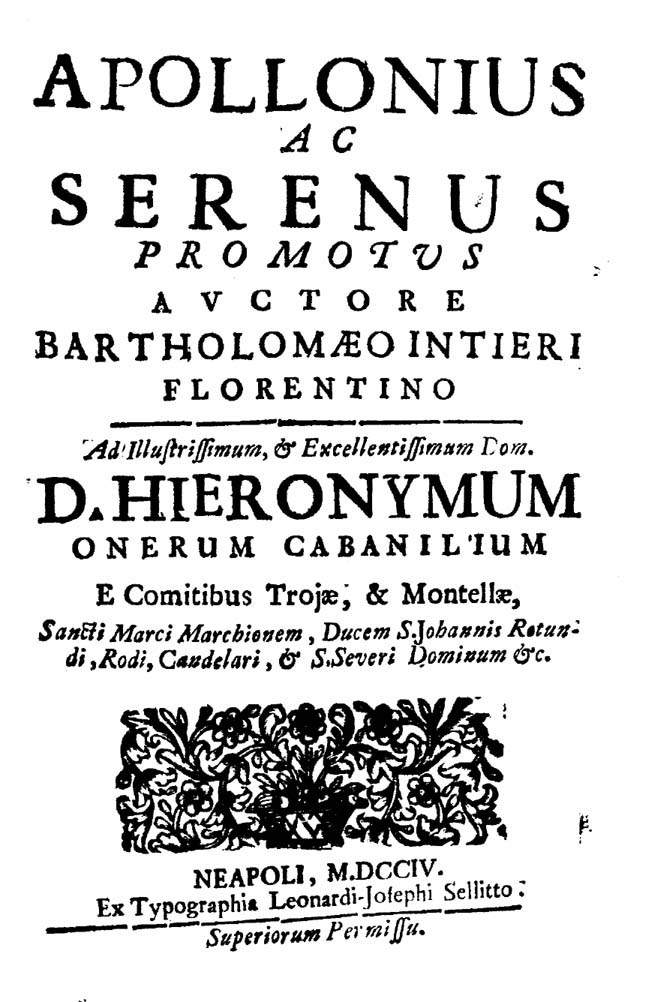
Apollonius ac Serenus promotus, 1704

Bartolomeo Intieri (Florence, 1678 – Naples, 27 February 1757) was an Italian agronomist.

== Life ==
Born in Florence in 1678, Interi moved to Naples in 1699. He studied mathematics, focusing on the theories by René Descartes, Galileo Galilei and Giovanni Alfonso Borelli. He composed two operettas at San Marco dei Cavoti, near Benevento, dedicating them to G. Cavaniglia, marquis of St. Mark. Since his writings did not reach the hoped-for success, he turned to the erudite Florentine librarian Antonio Magliabechi who pledged to gain them greater visibility.

He was interested in mechanics, in particular to the application to the construction of useful agricultural machines for the milling of grain. In 1716 he published Nuova invenzione di fabbricar mulini a vento (about windmills) dedicating the work to Wirich Philipp von Daun.

In March 1734 he obtained the task of administering Medici's allodal goods, engaging simultaneously as a secret informant of the Tuscan government. The information he provided was about the over-travels, the clashes between the Roman Curia and Neapolitan, and popular issues regarding protests and adherence to the monarchy.

When in 1743 he was released from his office following the death of Anna Maria Luisa de' Medici, the last representative in Florence of the Medici family, he continued to earn 600 ducats. During these years he accumulated a considerable amount of money that allowed him to build a residence on the Sorrento hills, in Massaquano, where he held various cultural debates surrounded by close friends like Ferdinando Galiani and Antonio Genovesi.

In 1754, he founded a chair in commerce and mechanics at the University of Naples and made sure that Antonio Genovesi was hired to the position.

== Works ==
- Intieri, Bartolomeo (1703). Ad nova arcana geometrica detegenda aditus (in Latin). Beneventi: e Typografia Archiepiscopali.
- Intieri, Bartolomeo (1704). Apollonius ac Serenus promotus (in Latin). Neapoli: ex typographia Leonardi Josephi Sellito.
- Bartolomeo Intieri (1706). Facilissimo metodo per la quadratura delle parabole di qualsivoglia grado, colla risposta alla questione proposta dal sig. G. C. all'illustriss. sig. d. Serafino Biscardi patritio cosentino, reggente nel supremo collateral consiglio di Napoli.
- Bartolomeo Intieri; Ferdinando Galiani; Francesco Cepparuli (1754). Della perfetta conservazione del grano discorso di Bartolommeo Intieri. presso Giuseppe Raimondi.
