= Treaty of Vienna (1738) =

Peace treaty, ended the War of the Polish Succession

The Treaty of Vienna or Peace of Vienna of 1738 ended the War of the Polish Succession. By the terms of the treaty, Stanisław Leszczyński renounced his claim on the Polish throne and recognized Augustus III, Duke of Saxony. As compensation he received instead the duchies of Lorraine and Bar, which were to pass to his daughter, Maria, the wife of King Louis XV of France, upon his death. Stanisław died in 1766 and his daughter in 1768.

Francis Stephen, who was the Duke of Lorraine, was indemnified with the vacant throne of the Grand Duchy of Tuscany, the last Medici having died in 1737. France also agreed to the Pragmatic Sanction in the Treaty of Vienna. In another provision of the treaty, the kingdoms of Naples and Sicily were ceded by Austria to Duke Charles of Parma and Piacenza, the younger son of King Philip V of Spain. Charles, in turn, had to cede Parma to Austria, and to give up his claims to the throne of Tuscany in favor of Francis Stephen.

Signed on 18 November 1738, the treaty was one of the last international treaties written in Latin (together with the Treaty of Belgrade signed the following year).

== See also ==
- List of treaties
