= Otto Ferdinand von Abensperg und Traun =

Austrian Generalfeldmarschall

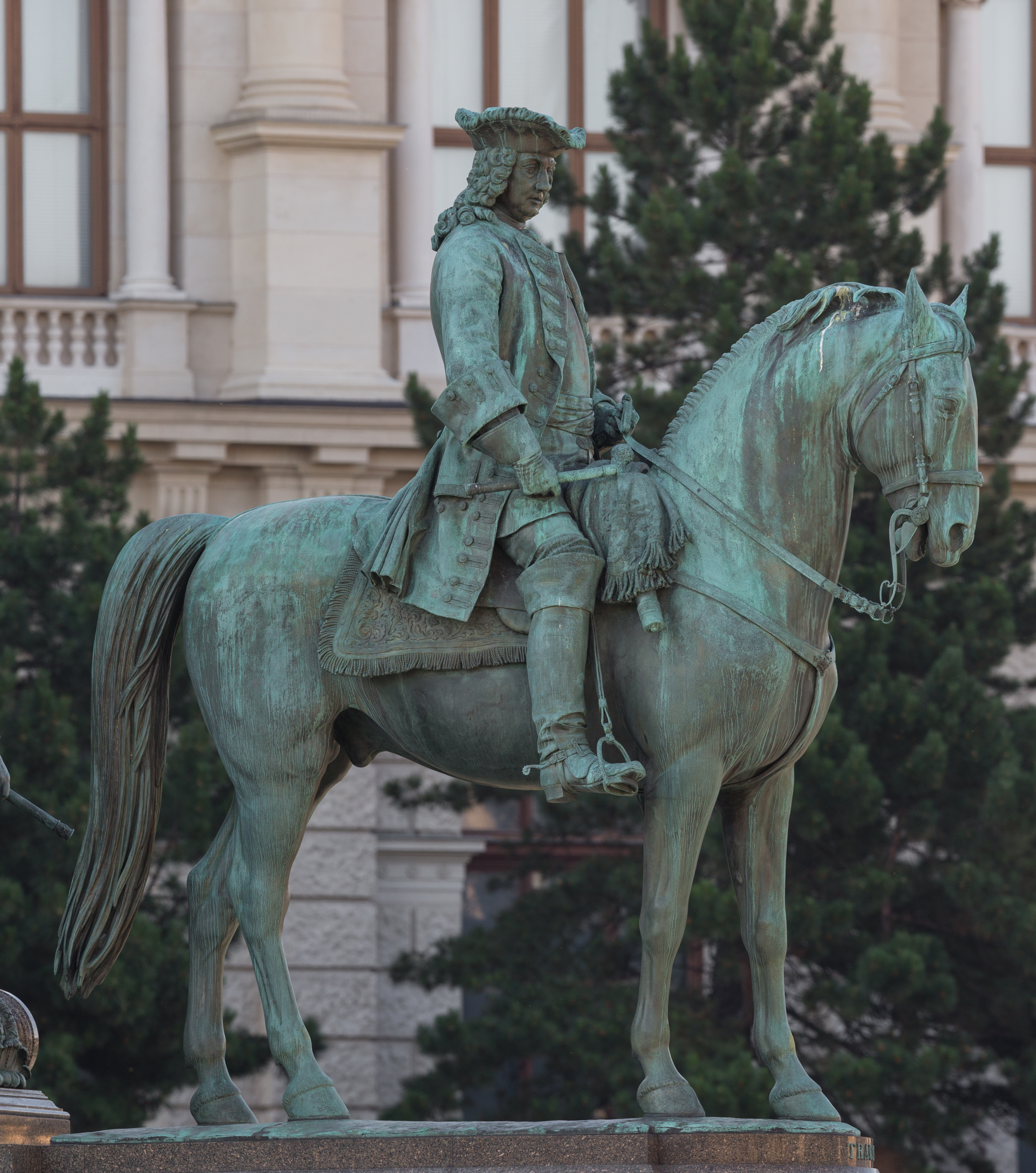
Statue of Traun on the Maria Theresa Memorial, Vienna

Otto Ferdinand Graf von Abensperg und Traun (or sometimes Otto Ferdinand von Abensperg und Traun) (27 August 1677 – 18 February 1748) was an Austrian Generalfeldmarschall. The current spelling of the name, and the spelling used in his time, is mostly Abensperg.

== Life ==
A member of the ancient Abensberg-Traun family, he was born at Ödenburg, Kingdom of Hungary and was the son of Imperial Count Otto Laurenz von Abensperg und Traun (1638–1695) and his second wife, Eva Susanna Rüber von Pixendorf (1645–1695). He was sent to Halle to complete his education, but in 1693 left the university to serve with the Prussian contingent of the allied army in the Low Countries. He saw extensive service in the War of the Grand Alliance, and at its close entered the Imperial Army. The War of the Spanish Succession soon followed, in which Traun served with distinction in Italy and on the Rhine till 1709, when he became lieutenant-colonel and aide-de-camp to Field Marshal Count Guido Starhemberg (1654–1737) in Spain.

A year later, for specially distinguished services, he was made a colonel, and in 1712 the chief of a regiment of foot. Soon after the close of the war he was again actively employed, and at the action of Francavilla in Sicily (20 June 1719) he received a severe wound. For his services in this campaign in southern Italy he was promoted to Generalfeldwachtmeister in 1723. In 1727 he became governor of Messina, and in 1733 he attained the rank of lieutenant field marshal.

In 1734 he won a European reputation for his defence of the pass of S. Germano and subsequent defence of the half-ruined fortress of Capua during the southern Italian campaign of the War of the Polish Succession, which he surrendered, marching out with the honours of war on 30 November. He was at once promoted Feldzeugmeister and employed in a difficult semi-political command in Hungary, after which he was made commander-in-chief in northern Italy and interim governor-general of the Milanese, in which capacity he received the homage of the army and civil authorities on the accession of Maria Theresa in 1740. In the following year he was made a field-marshal.

Traun successfully conducted the Italian campaigns of the War of the Austrian Succession up to 1743, winning the Battle of Campo Santo. On the death of Field-Marshal Count Khevenhüller, he was made the principal military adviser of Prince Charles Alexander of Lorraine, who commanded the Austrians in Bohemia and on the Danube. In this capacity he inspired the brilliant operations which led up to the passage of the Rhine and the skillful strategy whereby Frederick of Prussia was defeated in the Bohemian campaign of 1744 without a battle.

Traun's last active service was the command of an army which was sent to Frankfurt to influence the election of a new emperor to succeed Charles VII. He died at Hermannstadt (Sibiu, present Romania) on 18 February 1748 and was buried in the local Jesuit Church.

== Promotions ==
Traun was promoted to Generalfeldwachtmeister in October 1723 and to Feldmarschall Leutnant on 8 November 1733. He was raised in rank to Feldzeugmeister on 25 April 1735 and to Field Marshal on 9 April 1741.

== See also ==
- Abensberg-Traun
- Traun (disambiguation)

== Sources ==
Attribution

- "Траун, Оттон-Фердинанд" . Brockhaus and Efron Encyclopedic Dictionary (in Russian). 1906.
- Browning, Reed (1995). The War of the Austrian Succession. St. Martin's Press. ISBN 0-312-12561-5.
- Cust, Edward (1862). Annals of the Wars of the Eighteenth Century, 1739–1759. Vol. II. London: John Murray. OCLC 278260270.
- Schmidt-Brentano, Antonio (2006). "Kaiserliche und k.k. Generale (1618-1815)" (PDF) (in German). Österreichisches Staatsarchiv.
- Wrede, Alphons (1898). "Geschichte der K. und K. Wehrmacht, Vol. 1" (in German). Vienna: L. W. Seidel & Sohn.
