= Siege of Gaeta (1734) =

1734 siege

Coordinates: 41°12′46.85″N 13°34′23.75″E

- Part of the War of the Polish Succession
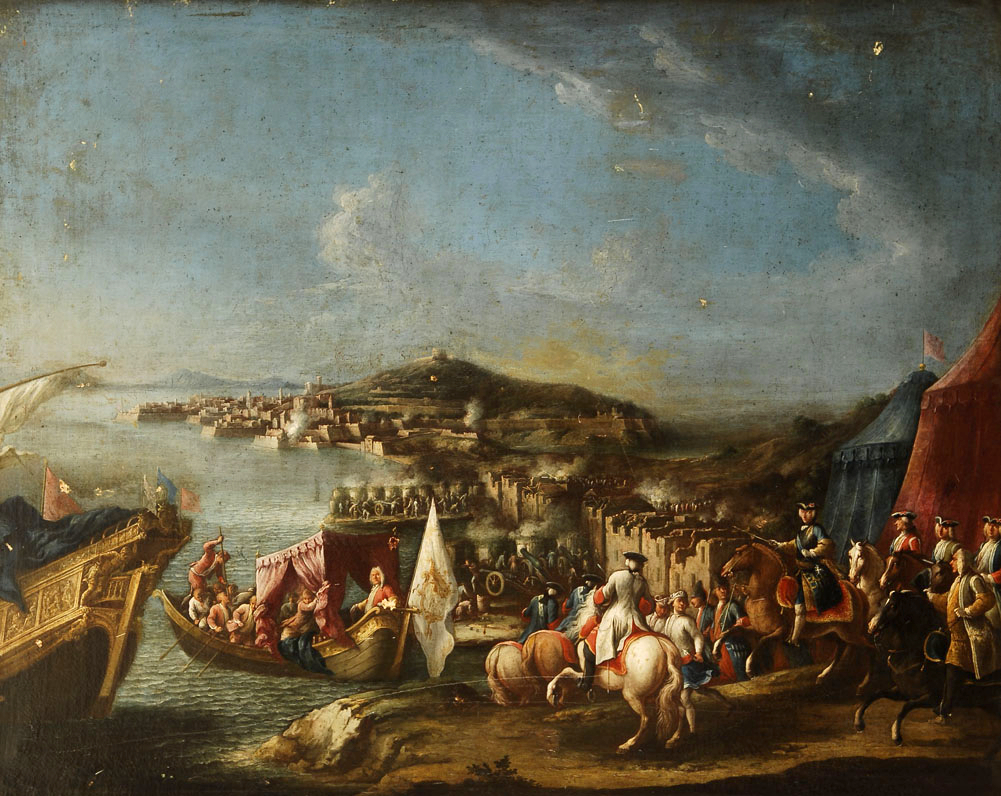
- Charles III of Spain at the Siege of Gaeta (1734). By Giovanni Luigi Rocco.
| Date | 8 April – 6 August 1734 |
| Location | Gaeta, Kingdom of Naples (present-day southern Italy) |
| Result | Franco-Spanish victory |

Belligerents
| Kingdom of Spain; Kingdom of France | Habsburg Monarchy |

Commanders and leaders
| (Spain) Duke of Parma | (Habsburg monarchy) Count von Tattenbach |

Strength
| 16,000 | 1,500 |

The siege of Gaeta was a siege during the War of Polish Succession fought at Gaeta, Italy. The Habsburgs at Gaeta withstood four months of siege from the Bourbon armies under the Duke of Parma (the future Charles III of Spain).

They were defeated on 6 August 1734 when the Spanish and French stormed the city. Twenty-seven years earlier, Austrian troops under Count Wirich Philipp von Daun had laid siege to Gaeta during the War of the Spanish Succession.

The Jacobite pretender Charles Edward Stuart was present for a time as an observer, his first exposure to war.
