= Franco-Indian alliances =

18th-century alliances between France and parts of India

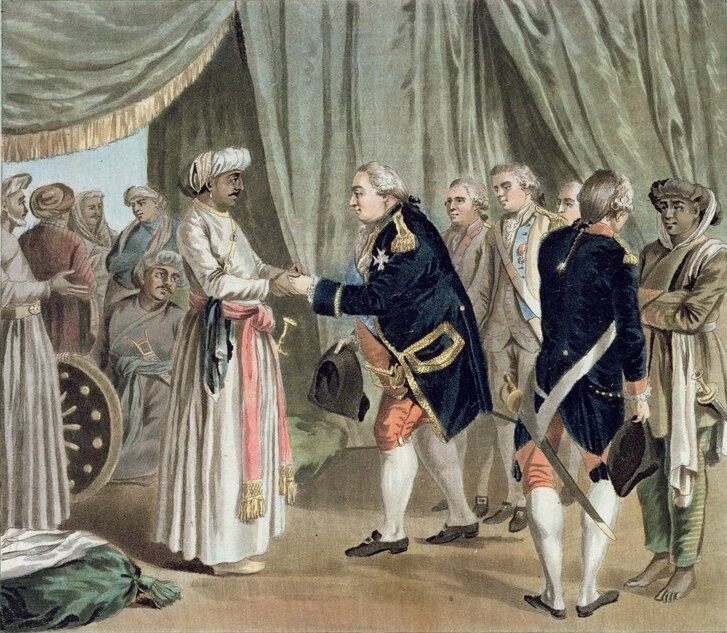
Suffren meeting with Hyder Ali in 1782, J.B. Morret engraving, 1789.

Foreign alliances of France

Frankish–Abbasid alliance
777–800s
Franco-Mongol alliance
1220–1316
Franco-Scottish alliance
1295–1560
Franco-Polish alliance
1524–1526
Franco-Hungarian alliance
1528–1552
Franco-Ottoman alliance
1536–1798
Franco-English alliance
1657–1660
Alliances with indigenous North Americans
1603–1763
Franco-British alliance
1716–1731
Franco-Spanish alliance
1733–1792; 1795-1808
Franco-Prussian alliance
1741–1756
Franco-Austrian alliance
1756–1792
Franco-Indian Alliances
1700s
Franco-Vietnamese
alliance
1777–1820
Franco-American alliance
1778–1794
Franco-Persian alliance
1807–1809
Franco-Prussian alliance
1812–1813
Franco-Austrian alliance
1812–1813
Franco-Russian alliance
1892–1917
Entente Cordiale
1904–present
Franco-Polish alliance
1921–1940
Franco-Italian alliance
1935
Franco-Soviet alliance
1936–1939
Treaty of Dunkirk
1947–1997
Western Union
1948–1954
North Atlantic Treaty
1949–present
Western European Union
1954–2011
European Defence Union
1993–present
Regional relations
- Asia
- Americas
- Africa

Various Franco-Indian Alliances were formed between France and various Indian kingdoms from the 18th century to the ascent of Napoleon. Following the alliances of Dupleix, a formal alliance was formed by King Louis XVI during the American Revolutionary War in an attempt to oust the British East India Company from the Indian subcontinent. Later, numerous proposals of alliance were made by Tipu Sultan, leading to the dispatch of a French fleet of volunteers to help him, and even motivating an effort by Napoleon to make a junction with the Kingdom of Mysore through his 1798 campaign in Egypt.

== Early French involvement ==
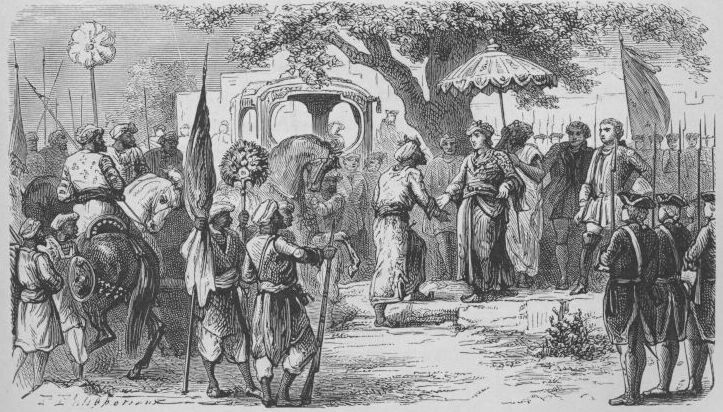
Dupleix meeting the Soudhabar of the Deccan, Murzapha Jung.

In the 17th century, François Bernier (1625–1688), a French physician and traveler, became the personal physician of the Mughal emperor Aurangzeb for 12 years.

In the early 18th century, France was actively involved in the powerplay in India. The French General Dupleix was allied to Murzapha Jung in the Deccan, and Chanda Sahib in the Carnatic Wars, in their conflict against Robert Clive of the East India Company. These relationships were beneficial to the French, and French allies gifted areas such as the Alamparai Fort in return for the services provided by the French in conflicts against the British.

The French won a victory in the Battle of Madras in 1746, and the French and Indians fought together and vanquished Anwaruddin in 1749, but failed in the Battle of Arcot in 1751 and finally surrendered in 1752. The French again had a success at the capture of Fort St. David in 1758 under Lally, but were finally defeated at Masulipatam (1759) and Wandewash (1760).

== Alliance of Louis XVI ==
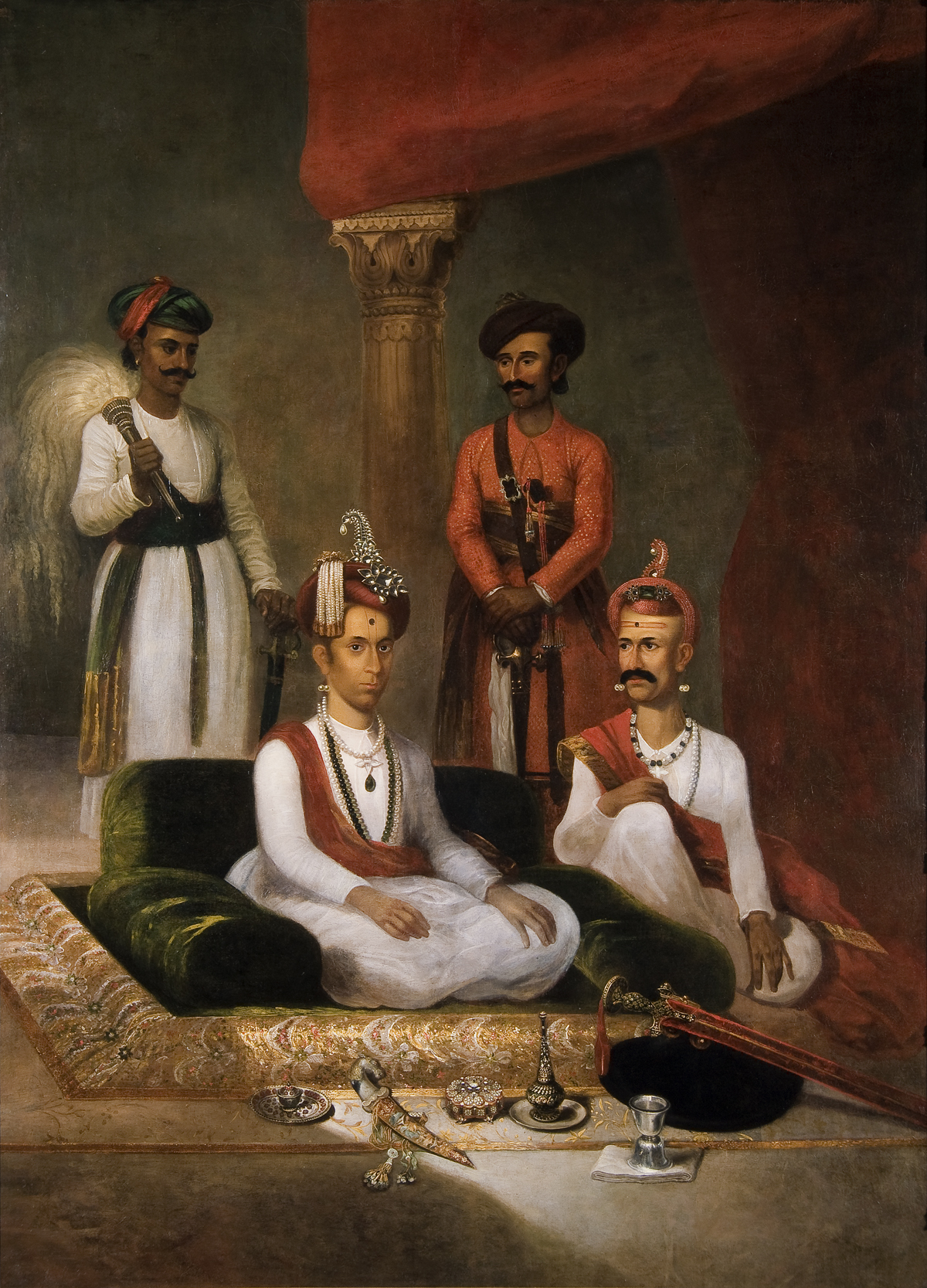
The Maratha Peshwa Madhav Rao Narayan formed an alliance with Louis XVI in 1782. Here, in Poona in 1792.

French had lost preeminence in India with the Treaty of Paris in 1763, although five trading posts were being maintained there, leaving opportunities for disputes and power-play with Great Britain. France was successful in supporting the American Revolutionary War in 1776, and wished to oust the British from India as well.

In 1782, Louis XVI sealed an alliance with the Peshwa Madhav Rao Narayan. As a consequence Bussy moved his troops to Île de France (Mauritius) and later contributed to the French effort in India in 1783. Suffren became the ally of Hyder Ali in the Second Anglo-Mysore War in 1782–1783, engaging in five battles against the Royal Navy off the coasts of India and Ceylon.

Between February 1782 and June 1783, Suffren fought with the British admiral Sir Edward Hughes, and collaborated with the rulers of Mysore. Suffren fought in the Battle of Sadras on February 17, 1782, the Battle of Providien on April 12 near Trincomalee, the Battle of Negapatam on July 6 off Cuddalore, after which Suffren seized upon the anchorage of Trincomalee compelling the small British garrison to surrender. An army of 3,000 French soldiers collaborated with Hyder Ali to capture Cuddalore. Finally, the Battle of Trincomalee took place near that port on September 3. These battles can be seen as the last battles of the Franco-British conflict that encompassed the American War of Independence, and would cease with the signature of the Treaty of Versailles of 1783 establishing peace and recognizing American independence.

=== Proposals of Tipu Sultan ===
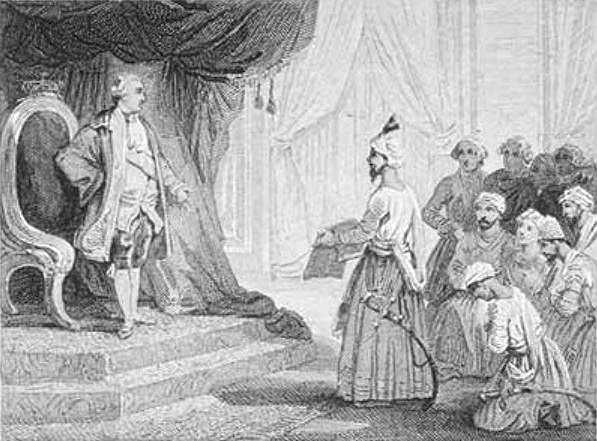
Louis XVI receives the ambassadors of Tipu Sultan in 1788, Voyer after Emile Wattier, 19th century.

Following the 1783 Treaty of Versailles and the removal of French support, Tipu Sultan, the son of Hyder Ali, was unable to recapture Mangalore from the British, although he later managed to regain control after a 10-month siege in 1784. He finally made peace with the British in spring 1784.

In 1786, Tipu Sultan nevertheless sent an embassy to France through Constantinople, but the embassy had to be cancelled. In July 1787, Tipu Sultan sent a new embassy directly to Paris, formed of three ambassadors Mohammed Dervich Khan, Akbar Ali Khan and Mohammad Osman Khan, who were accompanied by the French trader from Pondicherry, M. Monneron. After arriving in Toulon, the ambassadors were able to meet with Louis XVI in August 1788 in Versailles. However, France, which was now at peace with London, did not wish to resume hostilities.

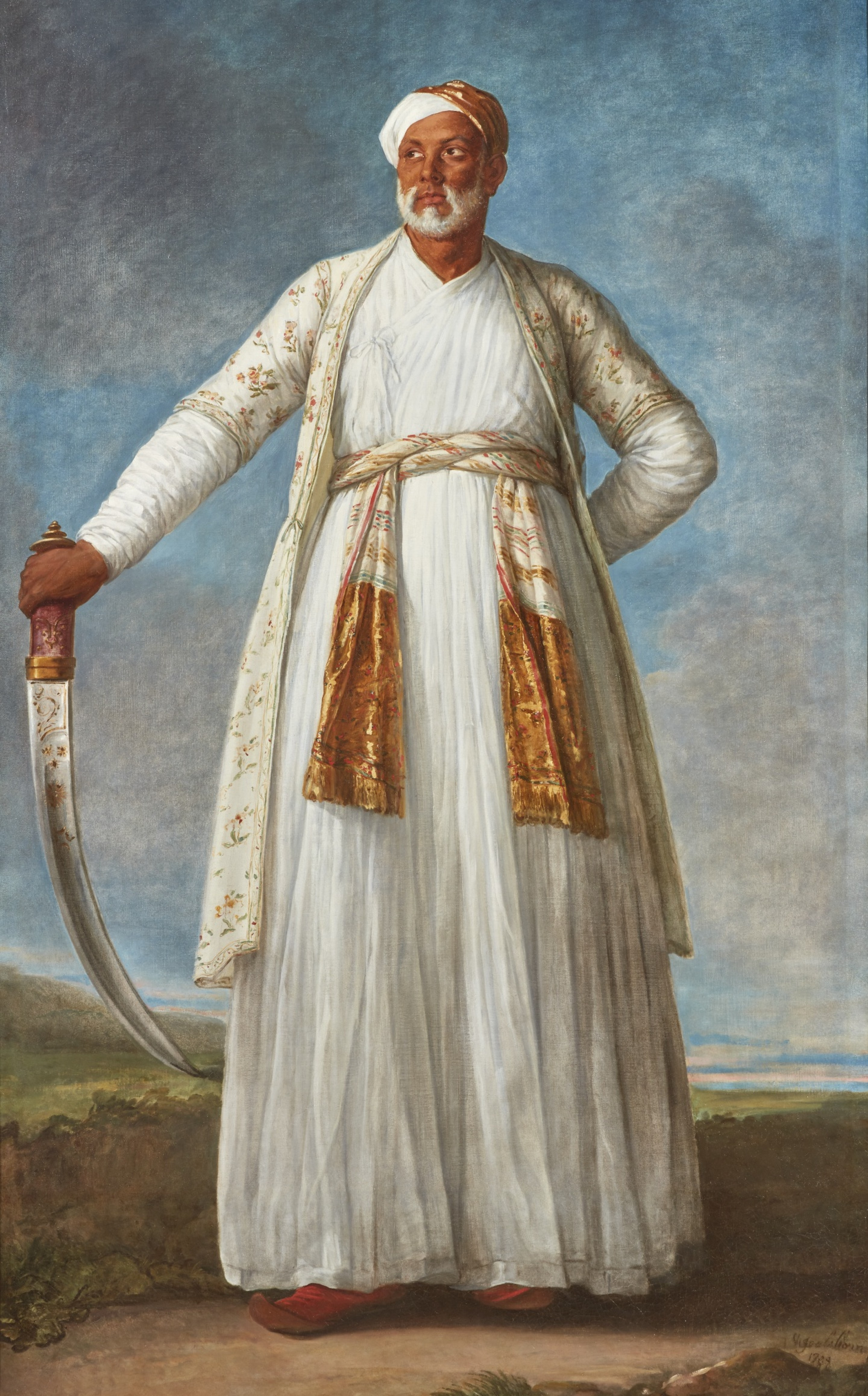
Elisabeth Vigée-Lebrun: Portrait of Mohammed Dervish Khan, Tipu's ambassador to France (1788)

Tipu Sultan again proposed an offensive and defensive alliance to France in October 1794, and April 1796. France was hampered in its support to India by the French Revolution, but contacts would resume with the rise of Napoléon.

In 1794, with the support of French Republican officers, Tipu helped found the Jacobin Club of Mysore for 'framing laws comfortable with the laws of the Republic' He planted a Liberty Tree and declared himself Citizen Tipoo.

French soldiers, mobilized by François Ripaud in 1797 to support Tipu Sultan, were buried in a cemetery at Harohalli, which has fallen into disrepair as the locals steal iron grills, bricks, metal plaques, and expensive marble.

== Napoleon's attempted junction with India ==
Tipu again made a proposal in October 1797 through Malartic, the Governor of Île de France (Mauritius). Malartic, who could not deplete his forces in Île de France, sent a group of 150 volunteers in the frigate La Preneuse, on 7 March 1798. La Preneuse arrived in Mangalore in April 1798. A group of French officers numbering 124 men, under the Command of Michel Raymond, was also leading an army of 14,000 for the Nizam, Subhadar of the Deccan Ali Khan Asaf Jah II, but following British diplomatic intervention, the Nizam was persuaded to remain neutral in the conflict.

Napoleon Bonaparte, who wished to establish a French presence in the Middle East, took the opportunity of his campaign in Egypt to plan a junction with Tipu against the British. Napoleon assured to the Directoire that "as soon as he had conquered Egypt, he will establish relations with the Indian princes and, together with them, attack the English in their possessions." According to a 13 February 1798 report by Talleyrand: "Having occupied and fortified Egypt, we shall send a force of 15,000 men from Suez to India, to join the forces of Tipu-Sahib and drive away the English." The Directory, though troubled by the scope and cost of the enterprise, agreed so the popular general would be absent from the centre of power.

Napoleon was defeated by a combined Ottoman-British force at the Siege of Acre in 1799, and at the Battle of Abukir in 1801, so that by 1802, France's presence was completely rolled back from the Middle-East. Soon however, from 1803, Napoleon went to great lengths to try to convince the Ottoman Empire to fight against Russia in the Balkans and join his anti-Russian coalition. Napoleon sent General Horace Sebastiani as envoy extraordinary, promising to help the Ottoman Empire recover lost territories. Napoleon also formed a Franco-Persian alliance in 1807 during the Napoleonic Wars, with the continuous aim of having an eventual open path to attack British India.

Napoleon's interest in the Middle East and India waned when he finally vanquished Russia at the Battle of Friedland in July 1807, leading to the Treaty of Tilsit, in December 1807. France as an ally of Russia became a strong repellent to both the Ottoman Empire and Persia. Great Britain signed a mutual defense treaty with Shah Shuja al-Mulk of Afghanistan on 17 June 1809 in order to better resist the Franco-Persian threat, but by that time Persia had already denounced its alliance with France and was moving towards Great Britain. These last events rendered the Franco-Indian alliance impossible to pursue further.

== See also ==
- Foreign alliances of France
- French India
- France–India relations
- Jacobin Club of Mysore
