= Anglo-French Alliance (1716–1731) =

Military alliance between Great Britain and France

Foreign alliances of France

Frankish–Abbasid alliance
777–800s
Franco-Mongol alliance
1220–1316
Franco-Scottish alliance
1295–1560
Franco-Polish alliance
1524–1526
Franco-Hungarian alliance
1528–1552
Franco-Ottoman alliance
1536–1798
Franco-English alliance
1657–1660
Alliances with indigenous North Americans
1603–1763
Franco-British alliance
1716–1731
Franco-Spanish alliance
1733–1792; 1795-1808
Franco-Prussian alliance
1741–1756
Franco-Austrian alliance
1756–1792
Franco-Indian Alliances
1700s
Franco-Vietnamese
alliance
1777–1820
Franco-American alliance
1778–1794
Franco-Persian alliance
1807–1809
Franco-Prussian alliance
1812–1813
Franco-Austrian alliance
1812–1813
Franco-Russian alliance
1892–1917
Entente Cordiale
1904–present
Franco-Polish alliance
1921–1940
Franco-Italian alliance
1935
Franco-Soviet alliance
1936–1939
Treaty of Dunkirk
1947–1997
Western Union
1948–1954
North Atlantic Treaty
1949–present
Western European Union
1954–2011
European Defence Union
1993–present
Regional relations
- Asia
- Americas
- Africa

The Anglo-French Alliance is the name for the alliance between Great Britain and France between 1716 and 1731. It formed part of the stately quadrille in which the Great Powers of Europe repeatedly switched partners to try to build a superior alliance. Some have suggested that between 1688 and 1815, Britain and France were 'natural enemies', and the period has become known as the Second Hundred Years' War, but their period spent as allies has been used to challenge the notion that the two states were implacable enemies.

== Creation ==
Following the end of the War of the Spanish Succession by the Peace of Utrecht (1713–15), British and French interests converged as they wished to stop the expansion of Spanish and Russian power. Although British Whig politicians had attacked the Peace of Utrecht under the slogan "No Peace Without Spain", given that it seemingly placed Spain under French control, they soon developed close relations with Paris, having returned to power following the Hanoverian succession. France faced an uncertain succession, as its new king Louis XV was a child and the Regent, Philippe II, Duke of Orléans was his heir by the terms of the Peace of Utrecht. Britain was wary of alienating the much larger France. Negotiations led to the creation of an alliance between the two in late 1716.

On 4 January 1717, it became the Triple Alliance when the Dutch Republic joined Britain and France against the looming threat of a resurgent Spain. That threat proved real when Spain recaptured Sardinia from Habsburg Austria with little opposition in August–October 1717, which was then followed by a Spanish landing in Sicily in July 1718. The three states were joined by Austria on 2 August 1718, thus forming the Quadruple Alliance. These four states co-operated during the War of the Quadruple Alliance to stop these Spanish attempts to re-conquer parts of Italy.

== End ==
In 1725, tensions rose again as Spain and Austria created an alliance at Vienna, which would grow to encompass the Russian Empire and the Electorates of Bavaria and Cologne. the Anglo-French alliance was subsequently expanded at Hanover, binding the Kingdom of Prussia, the United Provinces, the Kingdom of Sweden and the Kingdom of Denmark-Norway to them.

The birth of the Dauphin Louis in 1729 began to dissolve the French interest in the alliance, as their future was increasingly secure. In Britain a group of Austrophiles suggested that Austria would make a better potential partner for Britain. The actions of the French Chief Minister Cardinal Fleury were increasingly hostile towards Britain. The French failure to support the British during the Anglo-Spanish War (1727–1729) convinced many that they were no longer a reliable ally but were instead returning to the traditional position of a rival. The end of the alliance was never formally declared, but by early 1731, it was widely considered to be over.

In 1731, Britain, sensing the direction Cardinal Fleury was taking France, concluded an alliance with Austria. By 1742, Britain and France were on opposite sides during the War of the Austrian Succession and their colonial rivalry in North America continued.

== See also ==
- Foreign alliances of France
- Anglo-Austrian Alliance
- Anglo-Prussian Alliance (1756)
- France–United Kingdom relations
