= Franco-Polish Alliance (1524) =

1524 alliance between France and Poland

Foreign alliances of France

Frankish–Abbasid alliance
777–800s
Franco-Mongol alliance
1220–1316
Franco-Scottish alliance
1295–1560
Franco-Polish alliance
1524–1526
Franco-Hungarian alliance
1528–1552
Franco-Ottoman alliance
1536–1798
Franco-English alliance
1657–1660
Alliances with indigenous North Americans
1603–1763
Franco-British alliance
1716–1731
Franco-Spanish alliance
1733–1792; 1795-1808
Franco-Prussian alliance
1741–1756
Franco-Austrian alliance
1756–1792
Franco-Indian Alliances
1700s
Franco-Vietnamese
alliance
1777–1820
Franco-American alliance
1778–1794
Franco-Persian alliance
1807–1809
Franco-Prussian alliance
1812–1813
Franco-Austrian alliance
1812–1813
Franco-Russian alliance
1892–1917
Entente Cordiale
1904–present
Franco-Polish alliance
1921–1940
Franco-Italian alliance
1935
Franco-Soviet alliance
1936–1939
Treaty of Dunkirk
1947–1997
Western Union
1948–1954
North Atlantic Treaty
1949–present
Western European Union
1954–2011
European Defence Union
1993–present
Regional relations
- Asia
- Americas
- Africa

A Franco-Polish Alliance was formed in 1524 between the king of France Francis I and the king of Poland Sigismund I.

Francis I was looking for allies in Central Europe to create a balance against the power of Habsburg Emperor Charles V. Queen Bona Sforza, the Italian wife of Sigismund, was instrumental in promoting the alliance, with the objective of recovering sovereignty of Milan. Sigismund himself was motivated by such an alliance because Charles V was getting closer to Russia, thus threatening Poland on two fronts.

The negotiations were handled by Antonio Rincon in 1524, who was then followed by Jerome Laski. Through the agreement, the son of Francis, Henry, Duke of Orléans, was to marry a daughter of Sigismund I, and Sigismund's eldest son was to marry a daughter of Francis I. According to the same agreement, Sigismund was supposed to support Francis' efforts at reconquering Milan to which Sigismund had some right through his earlier marriage with Bona Sforza. The alliance was effectively signed in 1524.

The agreement fell through, however, when Francis I was vanquished by Charles V at the Battle of Pavia in 1525. When Francis again looked for Central European allies after 1526, he would look at Hungary instead and finally formed a Franco-Hungarian alliance with King Zapolya in 1528.

== See also ==
- Foreign alliances of France
