= Treaty of Paris (1657) =

1657 alliance between England and France

Foreign alliances of France

Frankish–Abbasid alliance
777–800s
Franco-Mongol alliance
1220–1316
Franco-Scottish alliance
1295–1560
Franco-Polish alliance
1524–1526
Franco-Hungarian alliance
1528–1552
Franco-Ottoman alliance
1536–1798
Franco-English alliance
1657–1660
Franco-Indian alliance
1603–1763
Franco-British alliance
1716–1731
Franco-Spanish alliance
1733–1792
Franco-Prussian alliance
1741–1756
Franco-Austrian alliance
1756–1792
Franco-Indian Alliances
1700s
Franco-Vietnamese
alliance
1777–1820
Franco-American alliance
1778–1794
Franco-Persian alliance
1807–1809
Franco-Prussian alliance
1812–1813
Franco-Austrian alliance
1812–1813
Franco-Russian alliance
1892–1917
Entente Cordiale
1904–present
Franco-Polish alliance
1921–1940
Franco-Italian alliance
1935
Franco-Soviet alliance
1936–1939
Treaty of Dunkirk
1947–1997
Western Union
1948–1954
North Atlantic Alliance
1949–present
Western European Union
1954–2011
European Defence Union
1993–present
Regional relations
- Asia
- Americas
- Africa

The Treaty of Paris signed in March 1657 allied the English Protectorate of Oliver Cromwell with King Louis XIV of France against King Philip IV of Spain, merging the Anglo-Spanish War (1654–1660) with the larger Franco-Spanish War (1635–1659). The treaty confirmed the growing rapprochement between France and the English Republican regime.

Until the mid-1650s, the French had been supporters of the Royalist exiles under Charles II, but the move towards an alliance with Cromwell led Charles to conclude the Treaty of Brussels with Spain in 1656.

== Terms ==
The English agreed to join France in its war against Spain in Flanders. France would contribute an army of 20,000 men. England would contribute both 6,000 troops and its fleet in a campaign against the Flemish coastal fortresses of Gravelines, Dunkirk and Mardyck.

Gravelines would be ceded to France and Dunkirk and Mardyck to England. Dunkirk, in particular, was on the Commonwealth's mind mainly because of the privateers that were causing damage to the mercantile fleet. For Cromwell and the Commonwealth, the question of possession of Dunkirk thus passed from a diplomatic possibility in the region to urgent political necessity.

== Sources ==
- Gardiner, Samuel Rawson (1901). History of the Commonwealth and Protectorate, 1649-1660. Longmans, Green.
