= Franco-Hungarian alliance in 1528 =

1528 alliance between France and Hungary

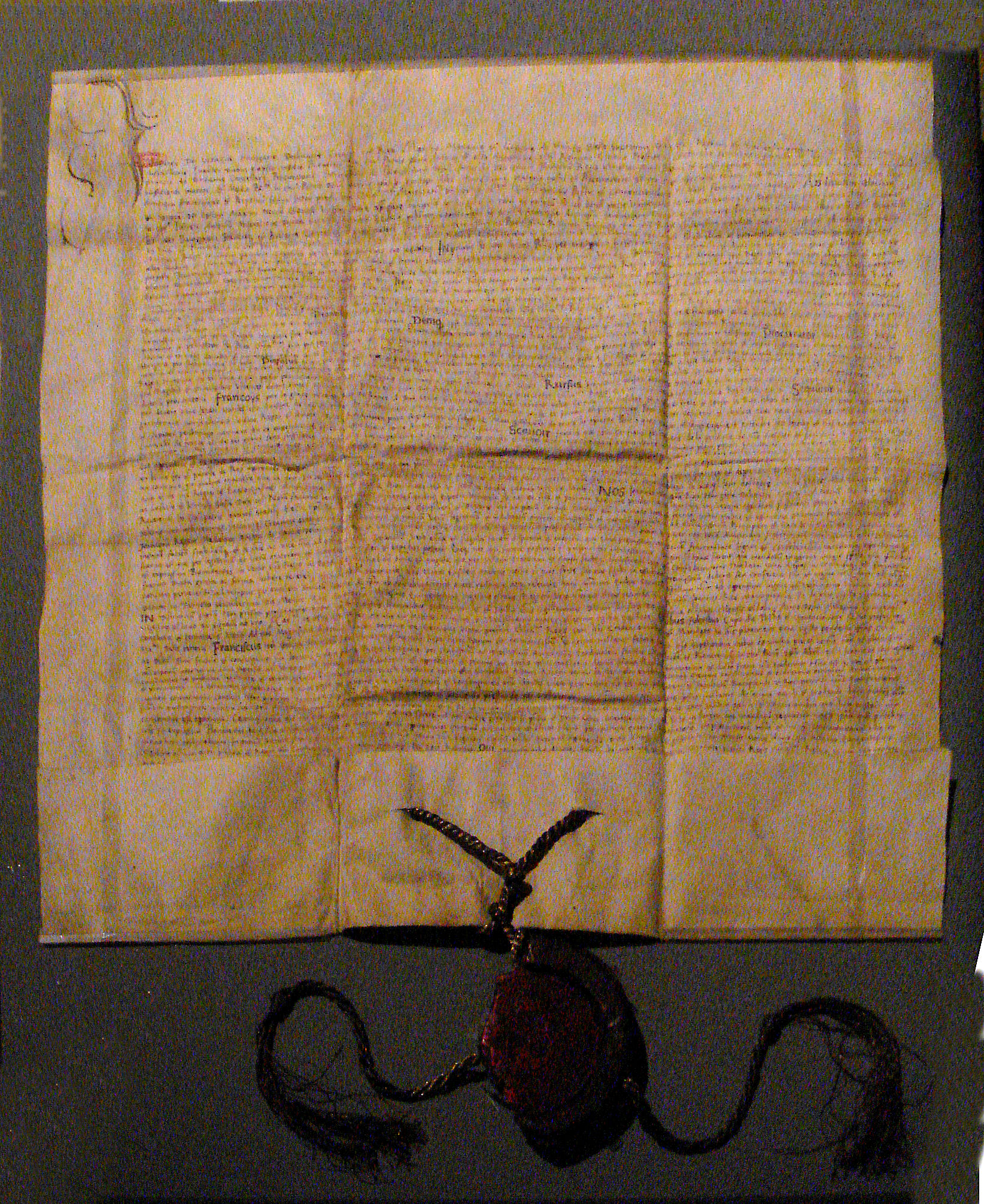
Franco-Hungarian Treaty of alliance, 1529.

Foreign alliances of France

Frankish–Abbasid alliance
777–800s
Franco-Mongol alliance
1220–1316
Franco-Scottish alliance
1295–1560
Franco-Polish alliance
1524–1526
Franco-Hungarian alliance
1528–1552
Franco-Ottoman alliance
1536–1798
Franco-English alliance
1657–1660
Franco-Indian alliance
1603–1763
Franco-British alliance
1716–1731
Franco-Spanish alliance
1733–1792
Franco-Prussian alliance
1741–1756
Franco-Austrian alliance
1756–1792
Franco-Indian Alliances
1700s
Franco-Vietnamese
alliance
1777–1820
Franco-American alliance
1778–1794
Franco-Persian alliance
1807–1809
Franco-Prussian alliance
1812–1813
Franco-Austrian alliance
1812–1813
Franco-Russian alliance
1892–1917
Entente Cordiale
1904–present
Franco-Polish alliance
1921–1940
Franco-Italian alliance
1935
Franco-Soviet alliance
1936–1939
Treaty of Dunkirk
1947–1997
Western Union
1948–1954
North Atlantic Treaty
1949–present
Western European Union
1954–2011
European Defence Union
1993–present
Regional relations
- Asia
- Americas
- Africa

A Franco-Hungarian alliance was formed in October 1528 between King Francis I of France and King John Zápolya of Hungary.

== Background ==
France had already been looking for allies in Central Europe. Its ambassador, Antonio Rincon, was sent on several missions to Poland and Hungary between 1522 and 1525. Since the 1522 Battle of Bicocca, Francis has wanted to ally with King Sigismund I the Old of Poland.

In 1524, a Franco-Polish alliance was signed between Francis and Sigismund, but the agreement fell through after Francis was vanquished by Charles V at the Battle of Pavia in 1525.

== Alliance with Hungary ==
In 1526, Francis I again started to look for allies in Central Europe, this time by turning his attention to Hungary. In 1528, John Zápolya was very vulnerable since he had been defeated by Ferdinand of Austria, his rival claimant to the throne of Hungary, at the Battle of Tarcal in August 1527. Besides the French alliance, Zapolya chose to become a vassal to the Ottoman Empire in February 1528 through the negotiations of Jerome Laski. Rincon went to Istanbul to bring the document, which triggered the development of relations between France and the Ottoman Empire.

The treaty was signed in France in Fontainebleau and Paris on 23 and 28 October 1528. It was then ratified by Zapolya at Buda on 1 September 1529. In the treaty, Francis promised to help Zapolya financially and through other means. In exchange, Zapolya agreed to continue the fight against Ferdinand of Austria and to provide Hungarian troops to Francis in Italy.

In the Little War in Hungary, France fought side by side with Zápolya and Suleiman the Magnificent against the Habsburgs. A French artillery unit was dispatched to the war in Hungary in 1543–1544 and was attached to the Ottoman Army.

== See also ==
- Foreign alliances of France
- Franco-Ottoman alliance
