= Franco-Austrian alliance =

Military alliance between France and Austria

Foreign alliances of France

Frankish–Abbasid alliance
777–800s
Franco-Mongol alliance
1220–1316
Franco-Scottish alliance
1295–1560
Franco-Polish alliance
1524–1526
Franco-Hungarian alliance
1528–1552
Franco-Ottoman alliance
1536–1798
Franco-English alliance
1657–1660
Alliances with indigenous North Americans
1603–1763
Franco-British alliance
1716–1731
Franco-Spanish alliance
1733–1792; 1795-1808
Franco-Prussian alliance
1741–1756
Franco-Austrian alliance
1756–1792
Franco-Indian Alliances
1700s
Franco-Vietnamese
alliance
1777–1820
Franco-American alliance
1778–1794
Franco-Persian alliance
1807–1809
Franco-Prussian alliance
1812–1813
Franco-Austrian alliance
1812–1813
Franco-Russian alliance
1892–1917
Entente Cordiale
1904–present
Franco-Polish alliance
1921–1940
Franco-Italian alliance
1935
Franco-Soviet alliance
1936–1939
Treaty of Dunkirk
1947–1997
Western Union
1948–1954
North Atlantic Treaty
1949–present
Western European Union
1954–2011
European Defence Union
1993–present
Regional relations
- Asia
- Americas
- Africa

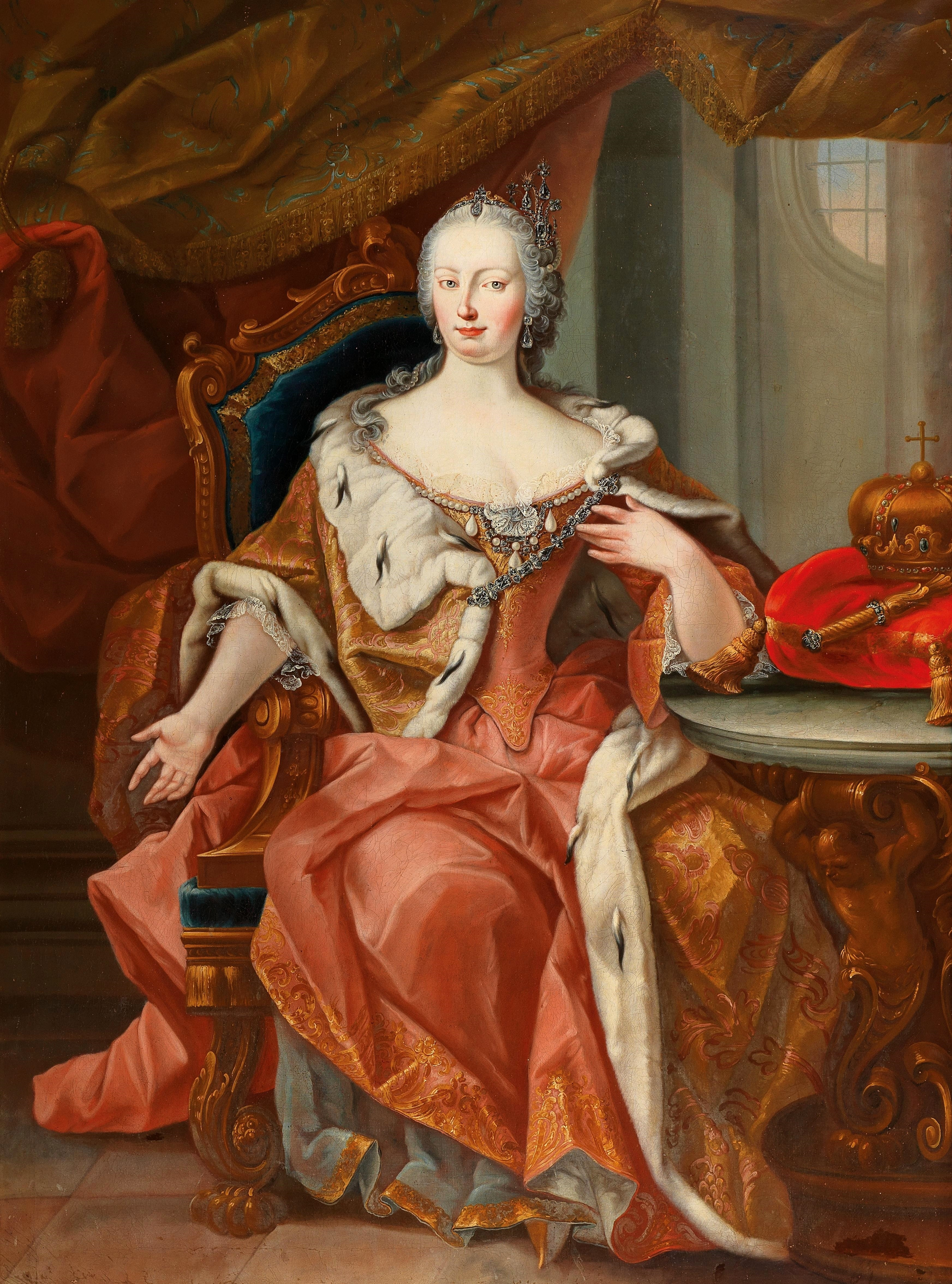
Empress Maria Theresa of Austria. Her empire's growing rivalry with Prussia led to an alliance with France, a historic enemy of Vienna.

The Franco-Austrian alliance was a diplomatic and military alliance between France and Austria that was first established in 1756 after the First Treaty of Versailles. It lasted for much of the remainder of the century until it was abandoned during the French Revolution.

The alliance had its heyday during the Seven Years' War, when France and Austria joined forces to fight their mutual enemy, Prussia. After the allies' defeat, the intimacy of the alliance weakened, and by the 1780s, the alliance had become something closer to a formality. Austria even briefly considered the idea of entering the American War of Independence on Britain's side against France. During the French Revolution, when France first declared itself a constitutional monarchy and then overthrew and executed its king, the alliance had collapsed entirely. Austria actively tried to restore the French monarchy by going to war with the French First Republic.

== Background ==
Throughout the 17th century and for the first half of the 18th century, France and Austria had been enemies and repeatedly fought wars against each other. During the War of the Polish Succession (1733–1735), France and its allies managed to weaken the power of Austria severely and forced it to give up small amounts of territory. In the War of the Austrian Succession (1740–1748), France allied with Prussia to attack Austria, which ended in Austria being forced to cede its richest and most prized province, Silesia, to the Prussians.

Britain's neutrality during the first war and failure to prevent Austrian losses in the second led to a breakdown in the Anglo-Austrian Alliance, which had formally existed since 1731. Austria began to consider gaining new allies to help it to recover Silesia, which was the priority of Maria Theresa, the ruler of Austria.

France and Habsburg Austria were two traditional geopolitical great rivals in Europe. Between 1494 and 1697, the French-Habsburg rivalry had played out in the Italian Wars, the Thirty Years' War and the Nine Years' War. The rise of the absolute monarchy in France was motivated partially by a desire to seek allies against the Habsburgs, even when the interests of the state went against the Church (as was the case in the Franco-Ottoman alliance or the Heilbronn League, with Protestant princes against the Habsburg-led Catholic League during the Thirty Years' War). That made the alliance a major diplomatic realignment for both France and Austria.

== Diplomatic Revolution ==
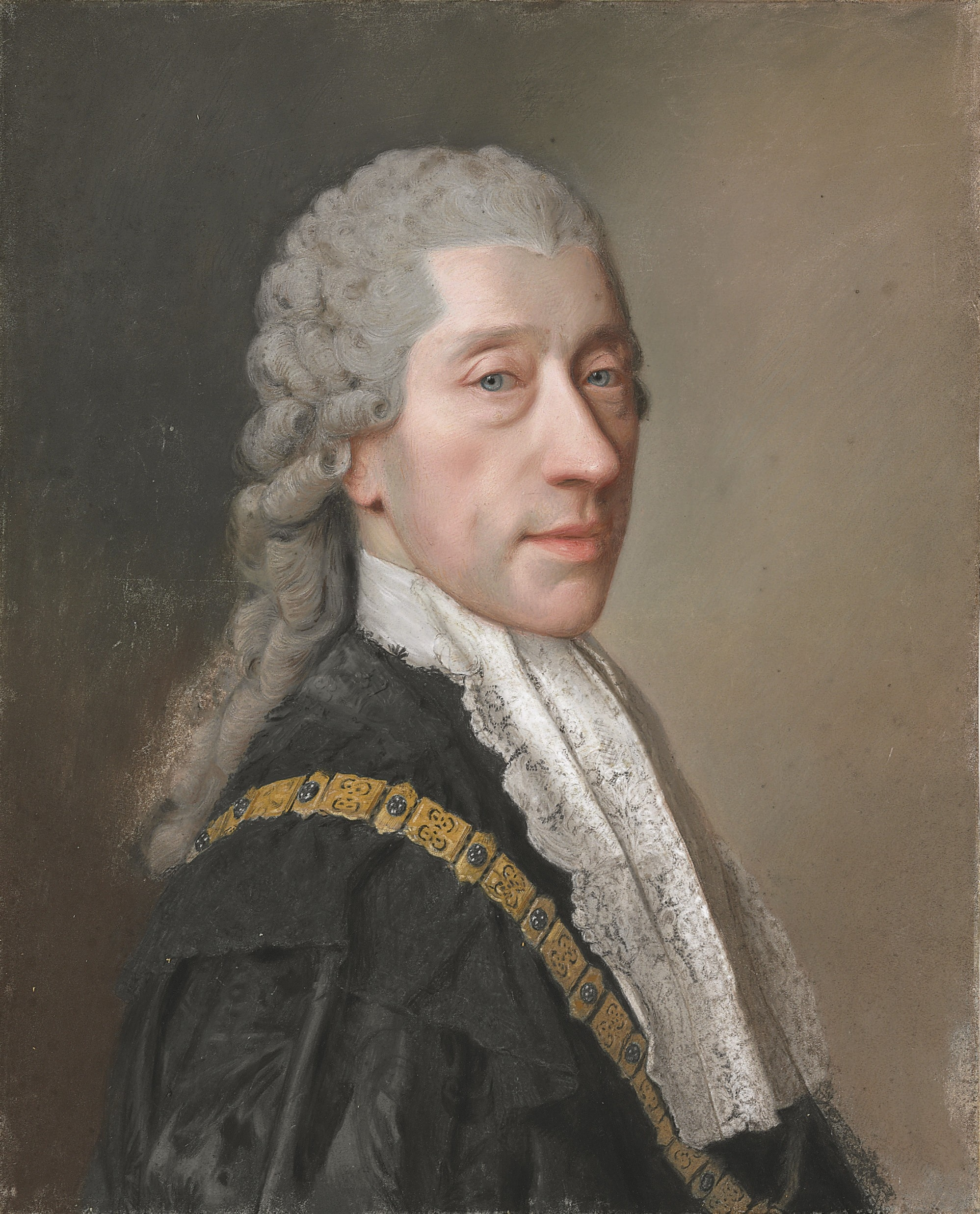
Wenzel Anton Count of Kaunitz-Rietberg was one of the major architects of the Franco-Austrian alliance.

By 1754, six years after the Treaty of Aix-la-Chapelle had brought the previous war to an end, a new figure, Count von Kaunitz, had risen to power in Vienna as a close advisor of Maria Theresa. He was committed to ending the British alliance and to looking for a new military partner. His friendship with the French ambassador, Choiseul, provided a close link between Paris and Vienna. Choiseul indicated to Kaunitz that France was willing to consider a rapprochement with Austria despite the long history of conflict between the two states. In 1756, Britain signed a limited defensive alliance with Prussia, Both Austria and French were outraged at what they perceived as a betrayal by their respective allies.

In response, Austria and France signed a defensive alliance of their own, the First Treaty of Versailles. It stipulated that if either was attacked by a third party, the other would come to its assistance. As Austria were now planning an attack on Prussia to retake Silesia, the treaty was seen as a way of preventing any other power from trying to intervene on the side of Prussia.

The sudden political changes formed part of what became known as the stately quadrille.

== Seven Years' War ==
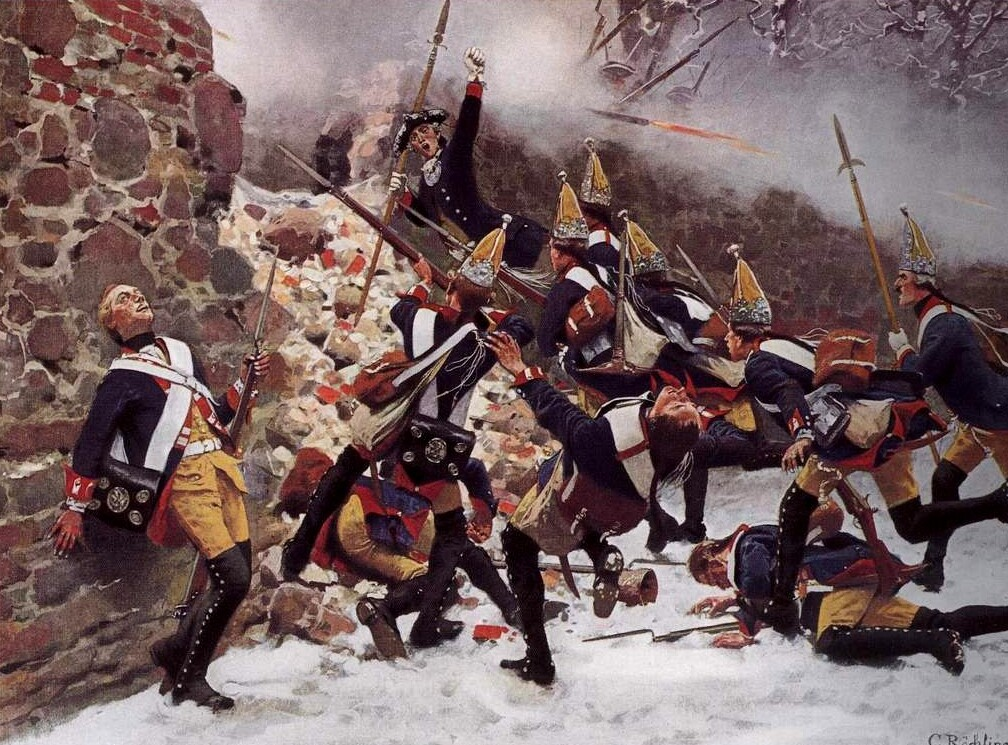
The 1757 Battle of Leuthen was a major turning point in the war thwarting the Austrian attempt to overrun Prussia and bring the conflict to a swift end.

In August 1756, Frederick the Great of Prussia, fearing that his country was about to be overrun and partitioned by its enemies, launched a pre-emptive strike against Austria's ally, Saxony, which he succeeded in capturing. That triggered the declaration of the Seven Years' War, and Austria went to war with Prussia with France as an ally. The Treaty of St Petersburg saw Sweden and Russia join the anti-Prussian alliance. Britain was Prussia's only major ally but was at war with France only, not with Austria, Russia, Saxony or Sweden.

The alliance reached its high-water mark in late 1757, when a French invasion overran Hanover, Austrian troops recaptured Saxony, and Austria liberated its own province of Bohemia, which had been occupied by Prussia. Having signed a Second Treaty of Versailles in 1757, the French were now committed to an offensive war and sent troops to aid the Austrians against Prussia as well as financial subsidies to support the large armies put onto the field by Austria. By autumn 1757, the Franco-Austrian forces had appeared to be about to overwhelm the much-smaller Prussia, which would then be partitioned by their allies. However, two decisive Prussian victories at Rossbach and Leuthen ended that offensive.

France and Austria struggled then to defeat their enemies, as Prussia fought them to a standstill in a conflict that was extremely costly in terms of men, resources and money and brought the French government just at the brink of bankruptcy. While French troops were poured into Germany, Britain went on the offensive against France's overseas empire, capturing French colonies in North America, the West Indies, West Africa and India. France was ultimately forced to abandon its financial commitments to Austria because of a lack of money. France and Austria continued fighting in Germany until late 1762, when an armistice was signed with Britain and Prussia.

In 1763, the Treaty of Paris forced Austria to acknowledge the continued Prussian ownership of Silesia, and France had to cede a number of colonies to the British. The war was extremely costly and left large swathes of Central Europe in ruins, with little discernible continental advantage for any of the participants.

== Peacetime alliance ==
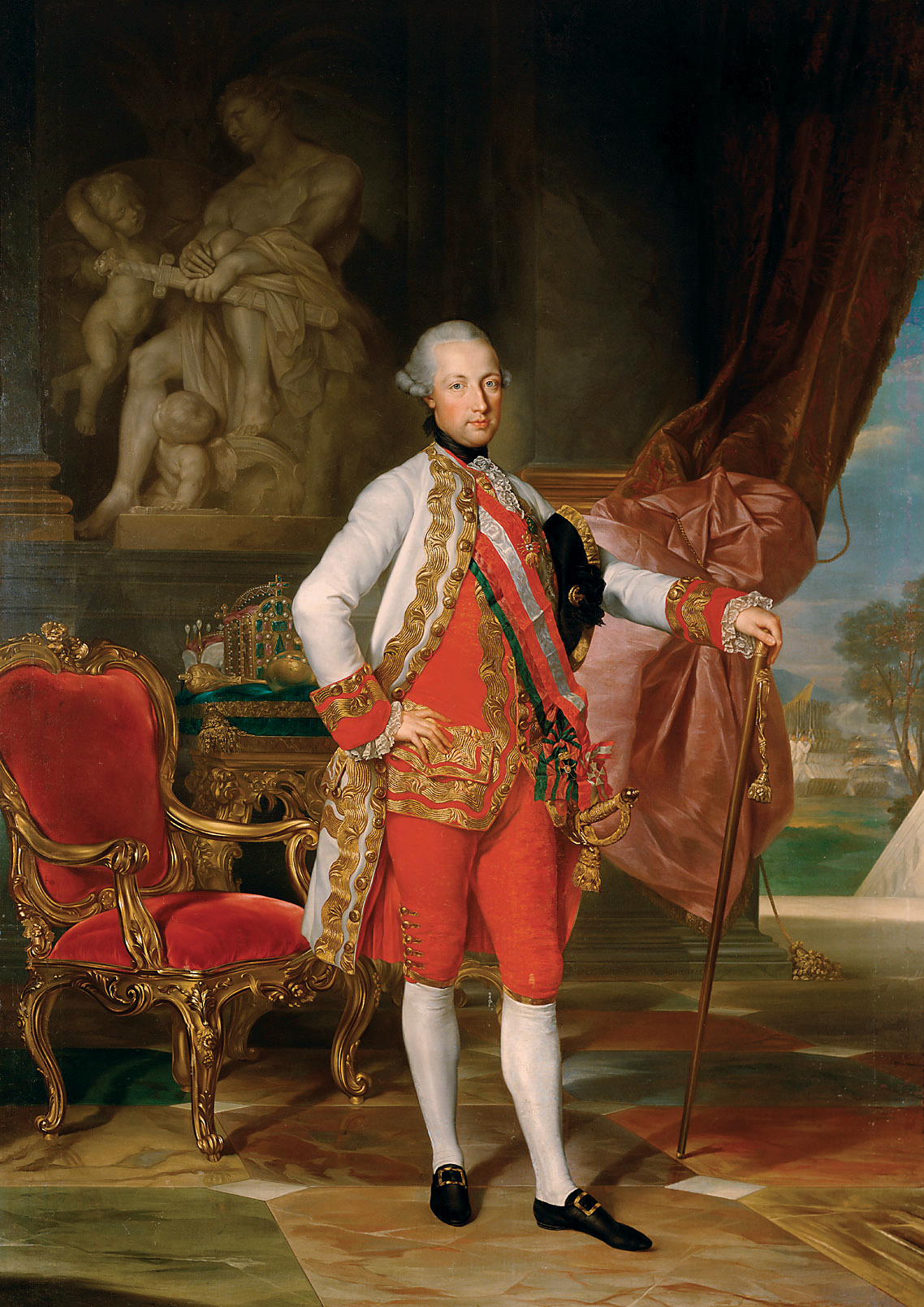
The alliance was weakened when Joseph II came to rule Austria.

Austria and France were disappointed with each other's military performance during the war. The failure of them and their allies to overwhelm Prussia was considered by France to be a major reason for the loss of numerous global French colonies to the British. The Austrians was unimpressed by the level of help that they had received from France to recover Silesia. That disappointment led to a cooling of relations between the two states, as France drew closer to its neighbour, Spain, and Austria looked to its Russian ally in the east, as both Austria and Russia shared an enmity towards the Ottoman Empire.

By the 1780s, the alliance had grown much weaker after the death of Maria Theresa and the fall from power of Kaunitz. The new emperor, Joseph II, was more willing to consider establishing fresh alliances, such as with Great Britain, which was fighting a global war against France, Spain, the Dutch Republic and the United States. (The latter having declared its independence in 1776.) Britain was diplomatically isolated and without a major ally and so it tried to secure Austrian support. Britain hoped that an Austrian attack on France would draw French resources back across the Atlantic to concentrate on Europe, which would thereby safeguard Britain's valuable West Indian colonies.

Although Austria ultimately remained neutral in the conflict, the alliance was considerably weakened, partly because the French failed to support Austria adequately in its brief War of the Bavarian Succession against Prussia. One of the strongest remaining links between the two states was the marriage of Marie Antoinette, the daughter of Maria Theresa and a sister of Joseph II, to Louis XVI of France, which had taken place in 1770. Marie Antoinette was mistakenly regarded by the French public as having enormous influence over her husband and in persuading him to pursue a pro-Austrian line. In reality, she had little control over Louis, who was guided instead by his ministers, including the anti-Austrian Comte de Vergennes.

== French Revolution ==
The French Revolution destroyed the ties between the two states, despite appeals by the French National Assembly for Austria to honour the 1756 treaty. In 1792, the Austrians sent troops to invade France and threatened to destroy Paris unless Louis XVI, now reduced to a constitutional monarch, was restored to his previous status. The Austrians suffered a defeat at the Battle of Valmy; Louis XVI was overthrown and, together with Marie Antoinette, was executed the following year. Austria has joined a coalition of states trying to crush the French revolutionaries by force, and Vienna became one of the centres of anti-revolutionary activity by giving shelter to many French royalist refugees.

== Napoleonic Wars ==
After the Austrian Empire was defeated in the War of the Fifth Coalition in 1809 by the First French Empire, the alliance was briefly revived. Francis II's second daughter, Marie Louise, married Napoleon I and became Empress consort of the French. The Austrians contributed 34,000 men to La Grande Armée during the French invasion of Russia.

The alliance broke down after Napoleon's retreat from Russia, and Austria joined the Sixth Coalition against France in 1813.

== See also ==
- Foreign alliances of France
- Anglo-Austrian Alliance
- Anglo–Prussian Alliance

== Bibliography ==
- Dull, Jonathon R. The French Navy in the Seven Years' War. University of Nebraska Press, 2005.
- MacDonogh, Giles. Frederick the Great: A Life in Deeds and Letters. Weidenfeld & Nicolson, 1999.
- McLynn, Frank. 1759: The Year Britain Became Master of the World. Pimlico, 2005.
- Mansel, Philip. Prince of Europe: The Life of Charles-Joseph De Ligne. Phoenix, 2005.
- Murphy, Orvile T. Charles Gravier: Comete de Vergennes: French Diplomacy in the Age of Revolution. New York Press, 1982.
- Simms, Brendan. Three Victories and a Defeat: The Rise and Fall of the First British Empire. Penguin Books, 2008.
