= Foreign alliances of France =

Foreign alliances of France

Frankish–Abbasid alliance
777–800s
Franco-Mongol alliance
1220–1316
Franco-Scottish alliance
1295–1560
Franco-Polish alliance
1524–1526
Franco-Hungarian alliance
1528–1552
Franco-Ottoman alliance
1536–1798
Franco-English alliance
1657–1660
Alliances with indigenous North Americans
1603–1763
Franco-British alliance
1716–1731
Franco-Spanish alliance
1733–1792; 1795-1808
Franco-Prussian alliance
1741–1756
Franco-Austrian alliance
1756–1792
Franco-Indian Alliances
1700s
Franco-Vietnamese
alliance
1777–1820
Franco-American alliance
1778–1794
Franco-Persian alliance
1807–1809
Franco-Prussian alliance
1812–1813
Franco-Austrian alliance
1812–1813
Franco-Russian alliance
1892–1917
Entente Cordiale
1904–present
Franco-Polish alliance
1921–1940
Franco-Italian alliance
1935
Franco-Soviet alliance
1936–1939
Treaty of Dunkirk
1947–1997
Western Union
1948–1954
North Atlantic Treaty
1949–present
Western European Union
1954–2011
European Defence Union
1993–present
Regional relations
- Asia
- Americas
- Africa

The foreign alliances of France have a long and complex history spanning more than a millennium. One traditional characteristic of the French diplomacy of alliances has been the "Alliance de revers" (i.e. "Rear alliance"), aiming at allying with countries situated on the opposite side or "in the back" of an adversary, in order to open a second front encircling the adversary and thus re-establish a balance of power. Another has been the alliance with local populations, against other European colonial powers.

== Geographic position and strategy of France ==
Over the centuries, France has constantly been looking for Eastern allies, as a counterbalance to Continental enemies. Throughout French history, this was especially the case against Austria-Hungary, Spain or Prussia: the Abbasid–Carolingian alliance (against the Umayyad Caliphate and the Byzantine Empire), the Franco-Hungarian alliance and Franco-Ottoman alliance (against the Habsburg Empire), the Franco-American alliance (against Great Britain), the Franco-Russian Alliance (against Germany). In particular, since 1870 the desire to counter German power has been a major motivating force leading France to create Eastern alliances.

== Autochthonous alliances ==
=== American continent ===
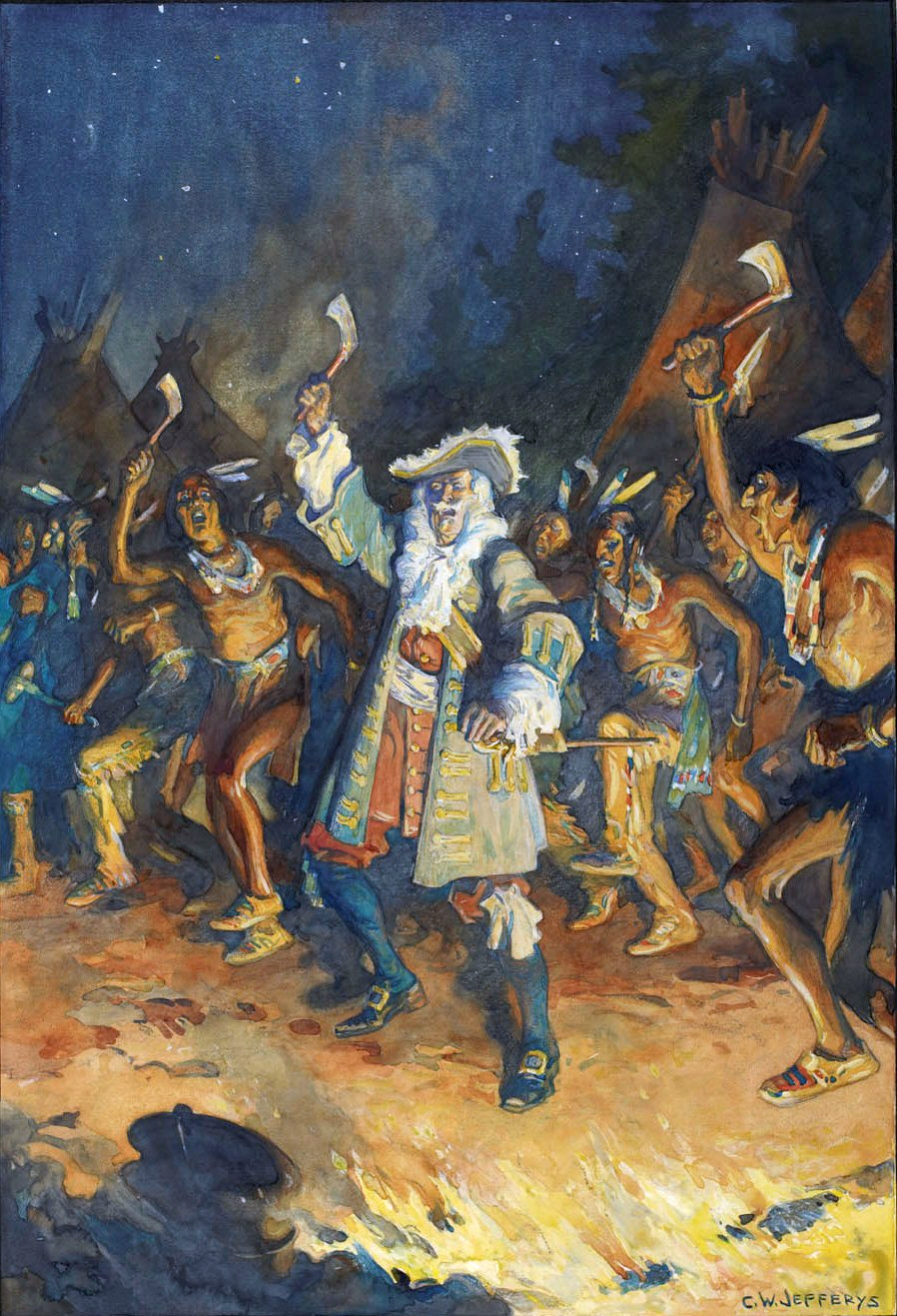
Frontenac with the Indians.

France also has a strong tradition of alliance with autochthonous populations in order to resist a powerful opponent. In the American continent, France was the first to identify that cooperation with local tribes would be strategically significant, before England also started to adopt this strategy. An important Franco-Indian alliance centered on the Great Lakes and the Illinois country took place during the French and Indian War (1754–1763). The alliance involved French settlers on the one side, and the indigenous peoples such as the Abenaki, Ottawa, Menominee, Winnebago, Mississauga, Illinois, Sioux, Huron, Petun, and Potawatomi on the other.

The French easily mixed and inter-married with the Indians, which greatly facilitated exchanges and the development of such alliances. Through these alliances with the Indians, the French were able to maintain for over 150 years a strong position in the New World at the expense of the British, who had much more difficulties in making Indian allies.

=== India ===
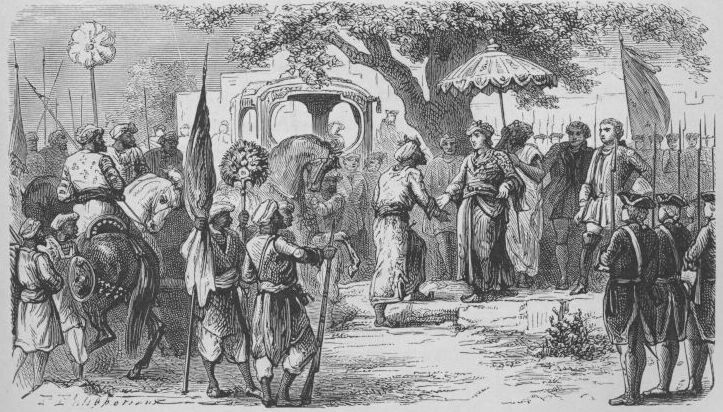
Dupleix meeting the Soudhabar of the Deccan, Murzapha Jung.

In India, the French General Dupleix was allied to Murzapha Jung in the Deccan, and Chanda Sahib in the Carnatic Wars, in the conflict against Robert Clive. The French succeeded in the 1746 Battle of Madras, and the French and Indians fought together and vanquished Anwaruddin in 1749, but failed in the Battle of Arcot in 1751 and finally surrendered in 1752. The French again had a success at the capture of Fort St. David in 1758 under Lally, but were finally defeated at Masulipatam (1759) and Wandewash (1760).

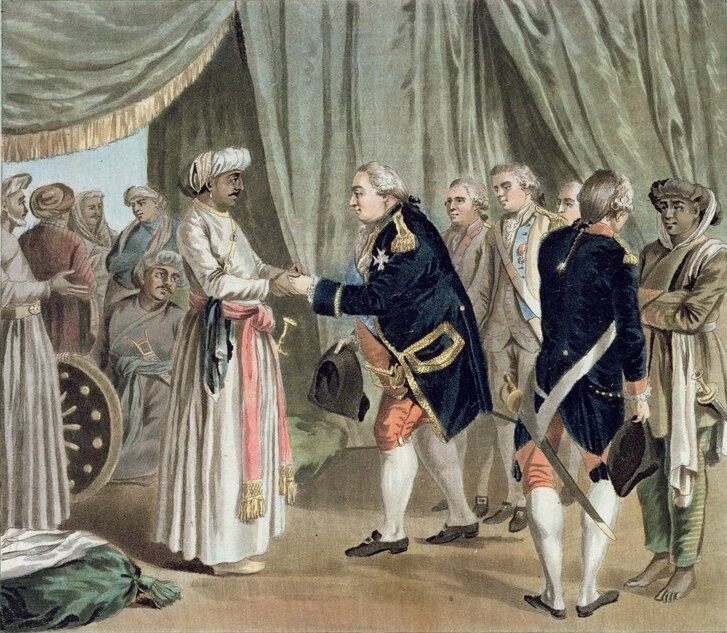
Suffren meeting with Hyder Ali in 1782, J.B. Morret engraving, 1789.

In 1782, Louis XVI sealed an alliance with the Peshwa Madhu Rao Narayan. As a consequence Bussy moved his troops to Isle de France (now Mauritius) and later contributed to the French effort in India in 1783. Suffren became the ally of Hyder Ali in the Second Anglo-Mysore War against the British from 1782 to 1783, fighting the Royal Navy on the coasts of India and Ceylon. From February 1782 until June 1783 Suffren fought the English admiral Sir Edward Hughes and collaborated with the rulers of Mysore. Suffren fought in the Battle of Sadras on 17 February 1782, the Battle of Providien on 12 April near Trincomalee and the Battle of Negapatam (1782) on 6 July off Cuddalore, after which he seized upon the anchorage of Trincomalee, compelling its small British garrison to surrender. An army of 3,000 French soldiers collaborated with Hyder Ali to capture Cuddalore. Finally the Battle of Trincomalee took place near that port on 3 September. These battles can be seen as the last battles of the Franco-British conflict that encompassed the American War of Independence, and would cease with the signature of the Treaty of Versailles (1783) establishing peace and recognizing America independence.

== Tactical alliances ==
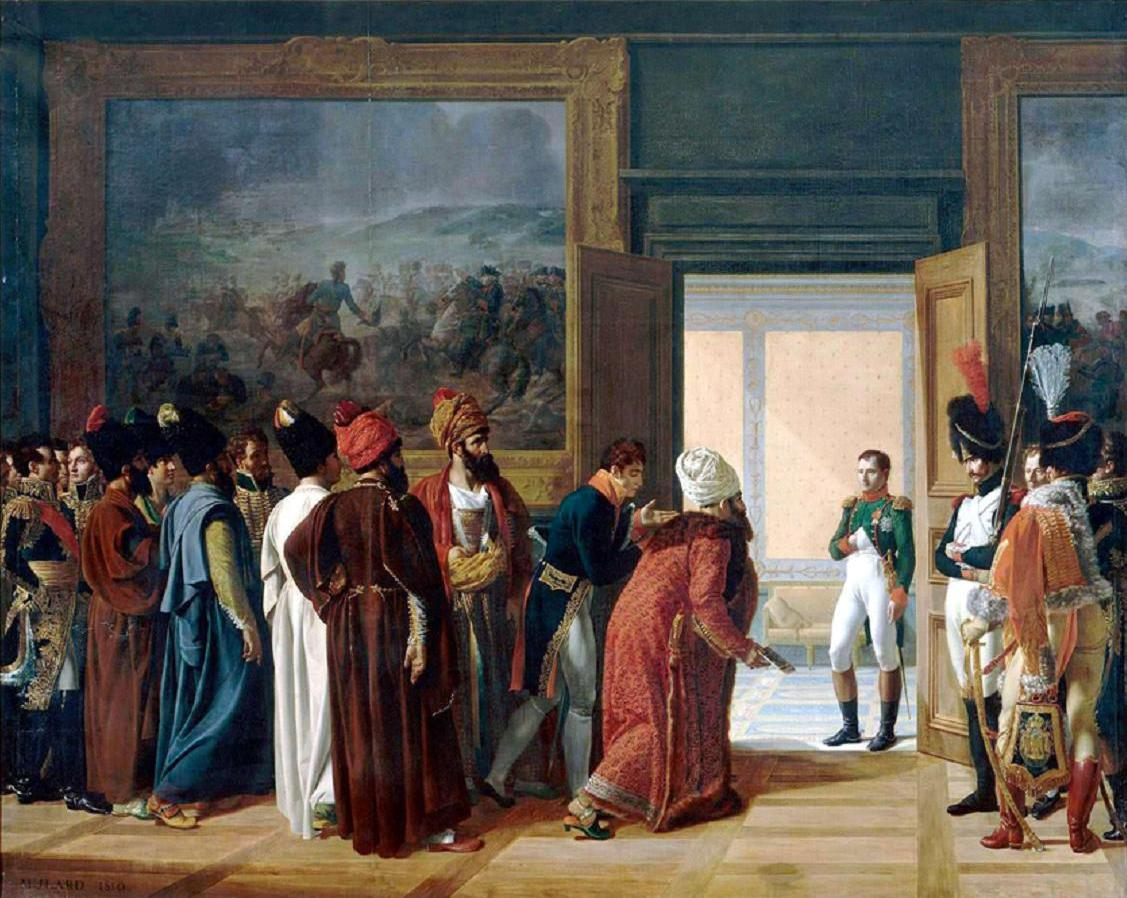
The Persian Envoy Mirza Mohammad-Reza Qazvini meeting with Napoleon I at the Finkenstein castle, 27 Avril 1807, to sign the Treaty of Finkenstein. François Mulard.

Some French alliances were purely tactical and short term, especially during the period of the French Revolutionary and Napoleonic Wars. Napoleon Bonaparte had launched the French invasion of Egypt in 1798 and fought against the Ottomans to establish a French presence in the Middle East, with the ultimate dream of linking up with the ruler of Mysore, Tipu Sultan, in order to attack British possessions in India. After having failed a first time, Napoleon entered into a Franco-Ottoman alliance and a Franco-Persian alliance in order to create an overland access for his troops to India. Following the visit of the Persian Envoy Mirza Mohammad-Reza Qazvini to Napoleon, the Treaty of Finkenstein formalized the alliance on 4 May 1807, in which France supported Persia's claim to Georgia, promising to act so that Russia would surrender the territory. In exchange, Persia was to declare war on Britain, and to allow France to cross the Persian territory to reach India.
