= Portrait of Muhammad Dervish Khan =

Painting by Elisabeth Vigee Lebrun

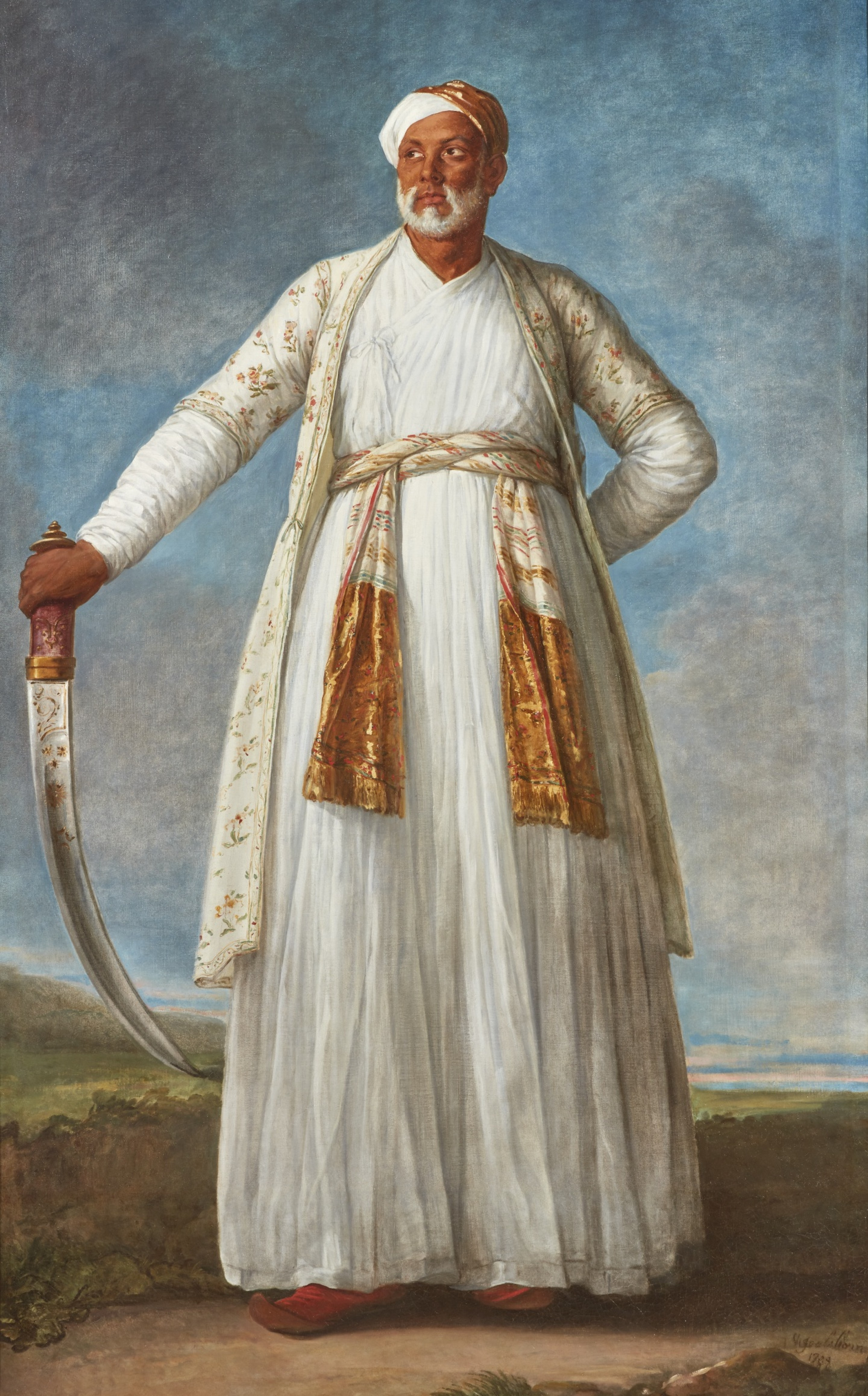
- Artist: Élisabeth Vigée Le Brun
- Year: 1788

Portrait of Muhammad Dervish Khan is an oil-on-canvas portrait painting by Elisabeth Vigee-Lebrun, from 1788. It is held in a private collection.

== History ==
It featured in the 2004 exhibition Encounters: the Meeting of Asia and Europe 1500-1800 at the Victoria and Albert Museum where it first received international attention as an unusually monumental portrait of a man from Mysore. Muhammad Dervish Khan was one of three ambassadors to the French court sent by Tipu Sultan.

After finishing the portraits and leaving them with the ambassadors to dry, Vigée Le Brun sought their return in order to exhibit them in the Paris Salon; one of the ambassadors refused the request, stating that a painting "needs a soul", and hid the paintings behind his bed. Vigée Le Brun managed to secure the portraits through the ambassador's valet, which enraged the ambassador to the point that he wished to kill his valet, but he was dissuaded from doing so as "it was not custom in Paris to kill one's valet". She falsely convinced the ambassador that the King wanted the portraits, and they were exhibited in the Salon of 1789. Unknown to the artist, these ambassadors were later executed upon their return to Mysore for failing in their mission to forge a military alliance with Louis XVI. After her husband's death, the paintings were sold along with the remnants of his estate, and Vigée Le Brun did not know who possessed them at the time she wrote her memoirs.

The portrait was never sold, though Vigée Le Brun fled Paris and left it behind when the city was mobbed.

== Provenance ==
The portrait of Mahomet Dervisch-Kam, premier ambassadeur de Typpo-Sultan was shown in the Paris Salon of 1789 in her absence, along with an even taller monumental portrait of Mahomet Usman-Kam, second ambassadeur de Typpo-Sultan that she painted (whereabouts unknown). Both paintings were admired greatly, partly because the ambassadors themselves had made quite a spectacle the year before. All three ambassadors returned to India without achieving the sought-for alliance and their heads were chopped off by order of the sultan, giving both paintings even more allure for their grim symbolism.

== Art market ==
It was sold at Sotheby's for $7,185,900, at 30 January 2019.

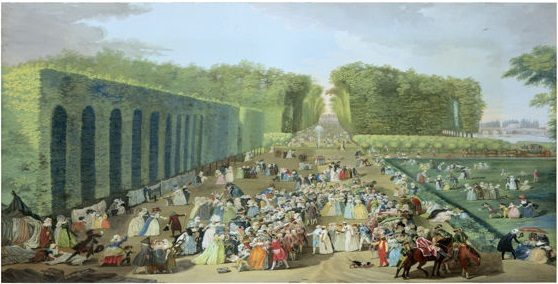
Promenade of the Ambassadors of Tipu Sultan in the Park of Saint-Cloud, by Charles-Eloi Asselin

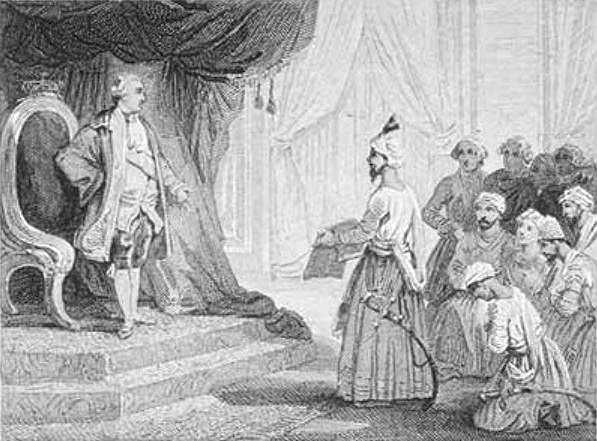
Louis XVI receives the ambassadors in 1788 negotiating Franco-Indian alliances

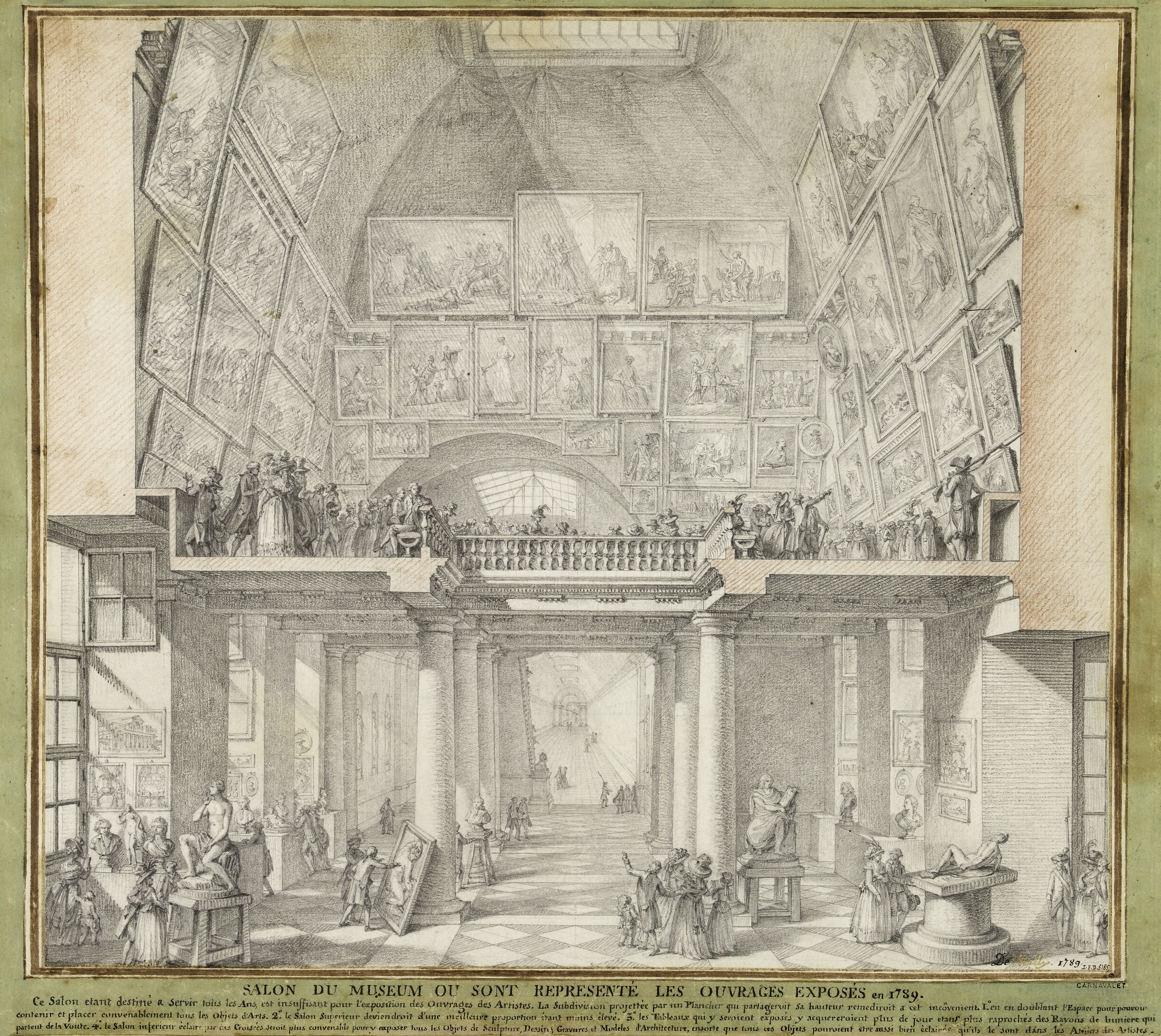
Paintings on display at the 1789 salon, by Charles De Wailly
