= Jacobin Club of Mysore =

1790s political organization in India

The Jacobin Club of Mysore was an alleged branch of the French Jacobin Club founded in 1794 by Frenchmen in the Kingdom of Mysore. It was purportedly supported by the ruler of Mysore, Tipu Sultan, who supposedly declared himself "Citizen Tippo" and planted a tree of liberty in support of the club's efforts.

== History ==
In 1794, Frenchmen in the Kingdom of Mysore allegedly founded the "Jacobin Club of Mysore". When they sent a delegation to Tipu Sultan, the ruler of Mysore, he responded by launching 500 Mysore rockets as part of the gun salute which welcomed them. Francis Ripauld was elected President-Citizen of the club, whose members declared their hatred for all kings except Tipu and loyalty to the French First Republic. During the subsequent Fourth Anglo-Mysore War in 1799, British forces captured French volunteers led by François Ripaud who were serving under Mysorean command in Hyderabad. In a 2005 paper, French historian Jean Boutier argued that the club's existence was fabricated by senior officials of the East India Company to justify their war against Mysore.
