= François Ripaud =

French privateer

François Fidèle Ripaud
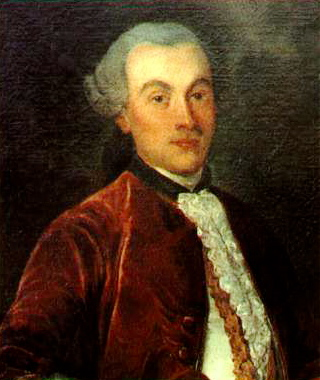
- Occupation: privateer

François Fidèle Ripaud de Montaudevert (1755 – 1814) was a French privateer best known for bringing a group of volunteers from Isle de France to aid Tipu Sultan of the Kingdom of Mysore in his conflicts with the British East India Company.

== Biography ==
François Ripaud was born in Saffré, northwestern France, in a middle-class family. He enrolled as a sailor at aged 11, on the Le Palmier. In 1770, he reached Mauritius, where he married in 1784. He had two children. In 1797, he sailed from Mauritius to Mangalore and sought a meeting with Tipu Sultan, in which he promised to raise a large force in Mauritius for the Sultan. In 1798, Ripaud came back to Mauritius with two envoys from Tipu Sultan. Anne Joseph Hippolyte de Maurès, Governor-General of Île de France (Mauritius) made a proclamation, on 29 January 1798, seeking volunteers for an "expedition to travel to Mysore to assist Tipu in his resistance to British encroachment in south India". Approximately 100 men were recruited, and they left for Mangalore on the French frigate La Preneuse on 7 March 1798.

The French involvement provided Governor-General Richard Wellesley with the pretext to invade Mysore, which culminated in the death of Tipu in May 1799.

== Bibliography ==
- À la mer, en guerre. Jean Feildel, 1965.
- Ces Hommes de la Mer. Marcelle Lagesse, IPC Edition, ISBN 2-906761-06-0.
- Voyages, aventures et combats, Chapter 14. Louis Garneray, Paris, Éditions Phébus, 1984; Rééd. Payot, 1991.
