= Franco-Soviet Treaty of Mutual Assistance =

1935 treaty between France and the Soviet Union

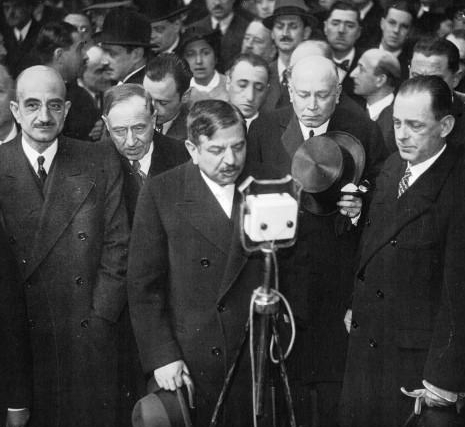

The Franco-Soviet Treaty of Mutual Assistance was a 1935 bilateral treaty between France and the Soviet Union with the aim of enveloping Nazi Germany and reducing the military threat from Central Europe. It was pursued by Maxim Litvinov, the Soviet foreign minister, and Louis Barthou, the French foreign minister, who was accidentally killed in October 1934, before negotiations had been finished.

His successor, Pierre Laval, was sceptical of the desirability and value of an alliance with the Soviet Union. However, after the declaration of German rearmament in March 1935, the French government forced the reluctant foreign minister to complete the arrangements with Moscow that Barthou had begun.

== Ratification ==
The pact was concluded in Paris on 2 May 1935 and ratified by the French government in February 1936. Ratifications were exchanged in Moscow on 27 March 1936, and the pact went into effect the same day. It was registered in League of Nations Treaty Series on 18 April 1936.

Laval had taken the precaution of ensuring that the bilateral treaty agreement was strictly compatible with the multilateral provisions of the League of Nations Covenant and the Locarno Treaties. That in practice meant that military assistance could be rendered by one signatory to the other only after both an allegation of unprovoked aggression had been submitted to the League of Nations, and the approval of the other signatories of the Locarno Pact (the United Kingdom, Italy and Belgium) being attained.

The Franco-Soviet Pact was no longer what Barthou had originally planned, but it remained to serve the purpose of acting as a hollow diplomatic threat of a two-front war if Germany pursued an aggressive foreign policy. Most of the Locarno powers felt that the pact would act only as a means of dragging them into a suicidal war with Germany for the Soviets' benefit.

The pact marked a large-scale shift in Soviet policy in the Seventh Congress of the Comintern from a pro-revisionist stance against the Treaty of Versailles to a more western-oriented foreign policy, as had been championed by Litvinov.

== Aftermath ==
On 16 May 1935 the Czechoslovak–Soviet Treaty of Alliance was signed after the Soviet treaty with France, which was Czechoslovakia's main ally.

Adolf Hitler justified the remilitarisation of the Rhineland by the ratification of the Franco-Soviet Pact by the French Parliament and claimed that he felt threatened by it. In the UK parliament, the former British Prime Minister David Lloyd George who was sympathetic to Germany stated that "if Herr Hitler had allowed that to go without protecting his country he would have been a traitor to the Fatherland".

The Franco-Soviet Treaty's military provisions were practically useless because of their multiple conditions, such as the requirement for Britain and Italy to approve any action. Their effectiveness was undermined even further by the French government's insistent refusal to accept a military convention stipulating how both armies would co-ordinate their actions in the event of a war against Germany. The result was a symbolic pact of friendship and mutual assistance that had little consequence other than raising the prestige of both parties.

However, after 1936, the French lost interest, and all of Europe realised that the pact was a dead letter. By 1938, the appeasement policies implemented by British Prime Minister Neville Chamberlain and French Prime Minister Édouard Daladier ended collective security and further encouraged German aggression. The German Anschluss of Austria in 1938 and Munich Agreement, which led to the dismemberment of Czechoslovakia in 1938 and 1939, demonstrated the impossibility of establishing a collective security system in Europe, a policy advocated by Litvinov. That and the reluctance of the British and the French governments to sign a full-scale anti-German political and military alliance with the Soviets led to the Molotov–Ribbentrop Pact between the Soviet Union and Germany in late August 1939, which indicated the Soviet Union's decisive break with France by becoming an economic ally of Germany.

== Text ==
Article 1
In the event that France or the U.S.S.R. are subjected to the threat or the danger of aggression on the part of a European state, the U.S.S.R. and France engage themselves reciprocally to proceed to an immediate mutual consultation on measures to take in order to observe the provisions of Article 10 of the League of Nations Pact.

Article 2
In the event that, in the circumstances described in Article 15, paragraph 7, of the League of Nations Pact, France or the U.S.S.R. may be, in spite of the genuinely pacific intentions of the two countries, and subject of unprovoked aggression on the part of a European state, the U.S.S.R. and France will immediately lend each other reciprocal aid and assistance.

Article 3
Taking into consideration the fact that, according to Article 16 of the League of Nations Pact, every member of the League that resorts to war contrary to the engagements assumed in Articles 12, 13 or 15 of the Pact is ipso facto considered as having committed an act of war against all the other members of the League, France and the U.S.S.R. engage themselves reciprocally, [should either of them be the object of unprovoked aggression], to lend immediate aid and assistance in activating the application of Article 16 of the Pact.
The same obligation is assumed in the event that either France or the U.S.S.R. is the object of aggression on the part of a European state in the circumstances described in Article 17, paragraphs 1 and 3, of the League of Nations Pact.

Protocole de Signature

Article 1
It is understood that the effect of Article 3 is to oblige each Contracting Party to lend immediate assistance to the other in conforming immediately to the recommendations of the Council of the League of Nations as soon as they are announced under Article 16 of the Pact. It equally understood that the two Contracting Parties will act in concert to elicit the recommendations of the Council with all the celerity that circumstances require and that, if nevertheless, the Council, for any reason whatever, does not make any recommendation or does not arrive at a unanimous decision, the obligation of assistance will nonetheless be implemented....

== See also ==
- Foreign relations of the Soviet Union
- Litvinov Protocol
- Soviet–French Non–Aggression Pact
- Franco-Polish Military Alliance
- Treaty of Berlin (1926)
- Italo-Soviet Pact
- Soviet–Polish Non-Aggression Pact
- Soviet–Finnish Non-Aggression Pact
- Soviet–Estonian Non-Aggression Pact
- Soviet–Lithuanian Non-Aggression Pact
- Sino-Soviet Non-Aggression Pact
- German-Soviet Non-Aggression Pact
- Soviet–Japanese Neutrality Pact
