= Alliances between France and indigenous North Americans =

18th century alliances with North American indigenous nations

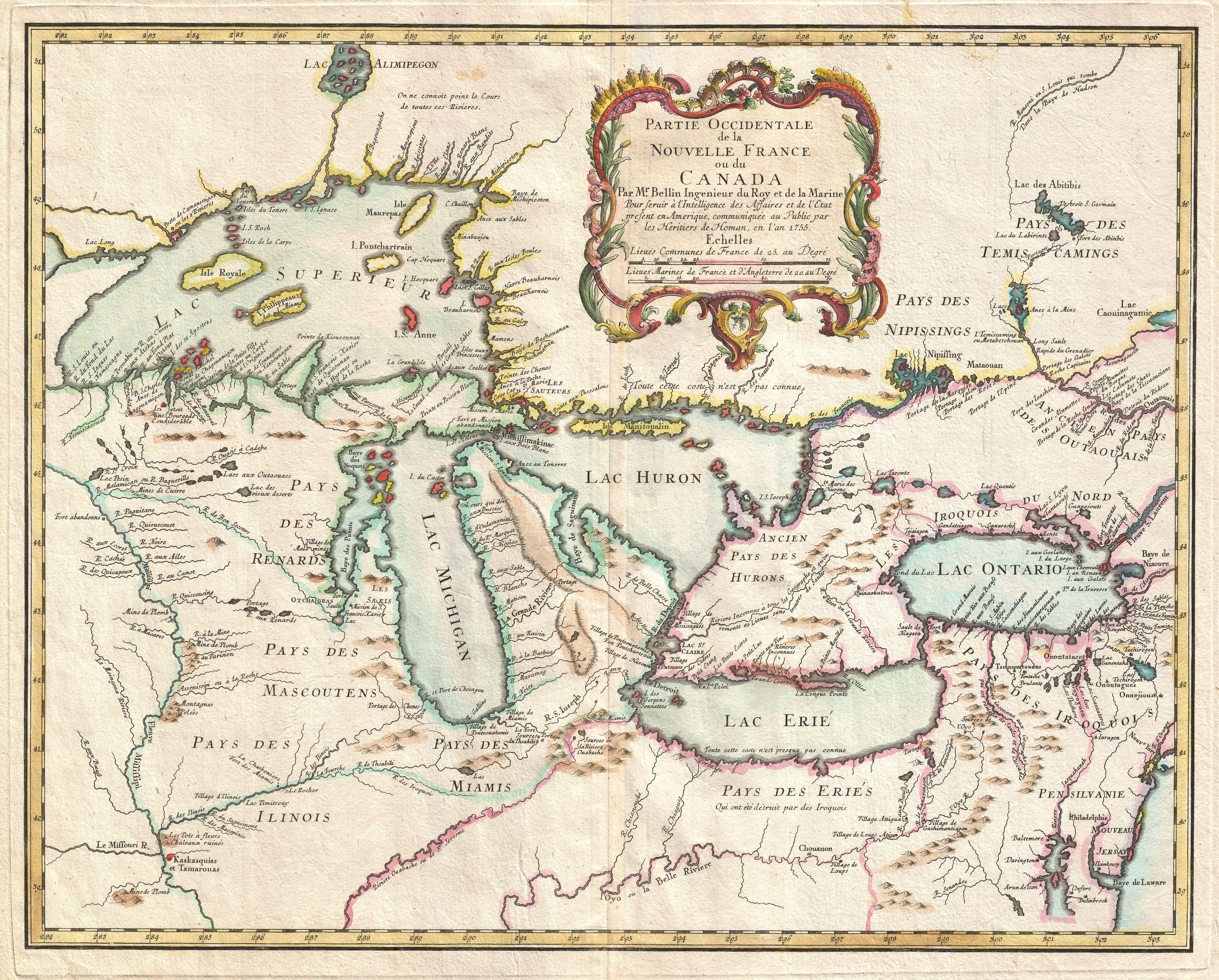
1755 map of the western portion of New France shows a territory that is very much dominated by various American indigenous nations though nominally under a tenuous French hegemony. The vast lands of the Miami, the Iroquois, the Erie, the Huron, the Renard, the Mascouten, and the Illinois overwhelm tiny bastions of French power in the form of various forts and missions. The French, without the vast colonial resources of the English and Spanish, relied heavily on an alliance with, rather than outright control of, indigenous populations.

France and various North American indigenous nations established alliances during the French and Indian War (1754–1763). The alliance involved French settlers on the one side, and indigenous peoples living in the area of the Great Lakes and the Illinois country such as the Abenaki, Odawa, Menominee, Ho-Chunk, Mississauga, Illinois, Sioux, Wendat (Huron), Petun, and Potawatomi on the other. It allowed the French and the natives to form a haven in the middle-Ohio valley before the open conflict between the European powers erupted.

== Background ==
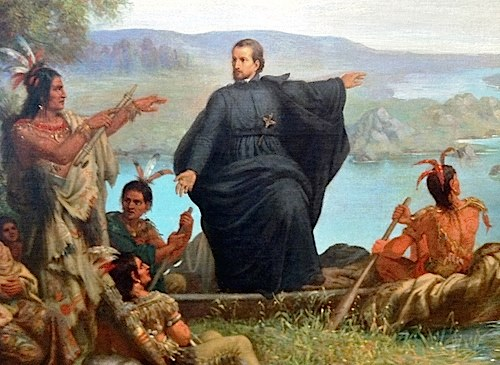
Father Jacques Marquette with Indians.

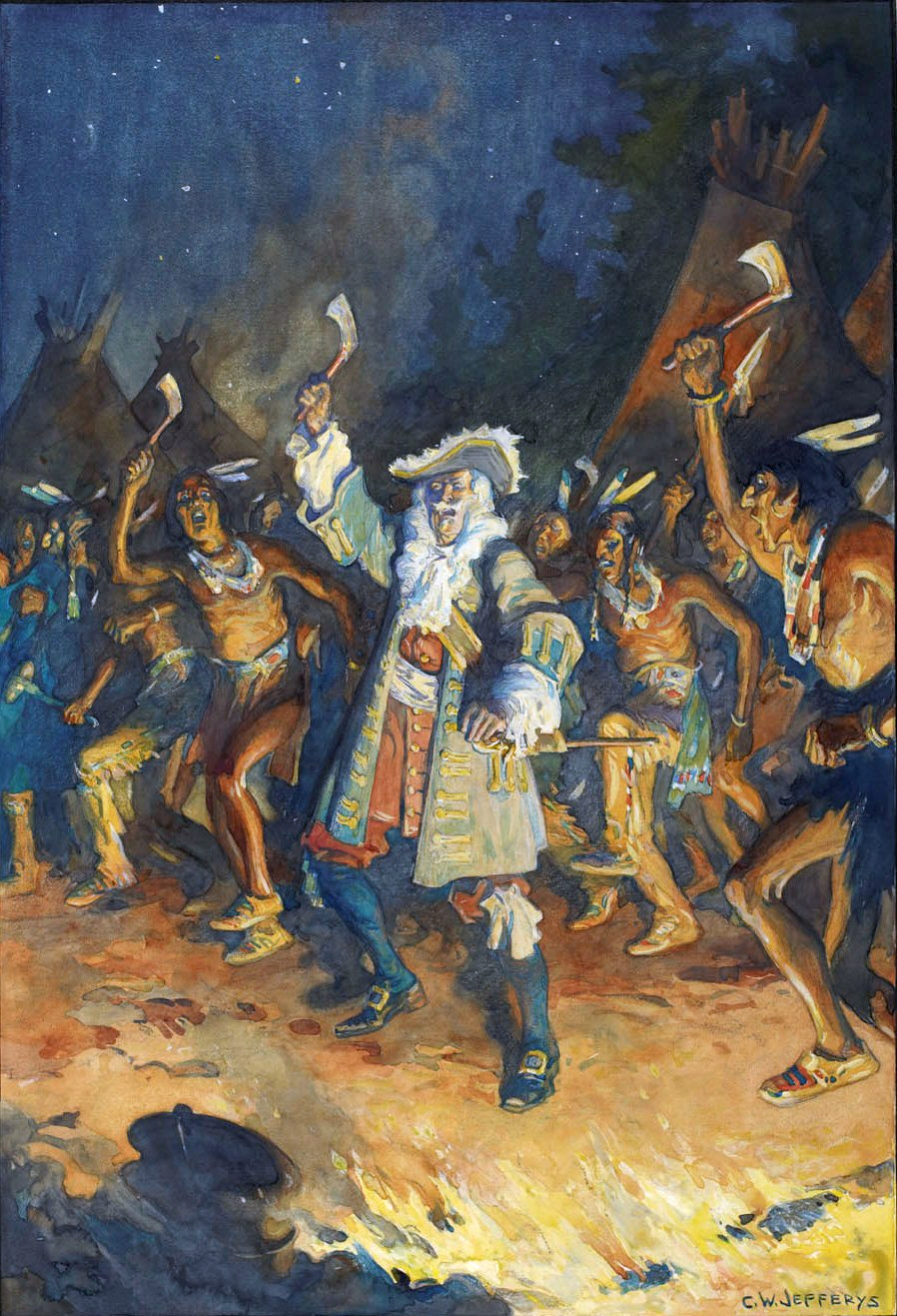
Frontenac with the Indians.

France had a long presence in Northern America, starting with the establishment of New France in 1534. Acculturation and conversion were promoted, especially through the activities of the Jesuit missions in North America. But unlike the other colonial powers, France, under the guidance of Louis XIII and Cardinal Richelieu, encouraged a peaceful coexistence in New France between Natives and Colonists. Indigenous persons, converted to Catholicism, were considered as "natural Frenchmen" by the Ordonnance of 1627:

The descendants of the French who are accustomed to this country [New France], together with all the Indians who will be brought to the knowledge of the faith and will profess it, shall be deemed and renowned natural Frenchmen, and as such may come to live in France when they want, and acquire, donate, and succeed and accept donations and legacies, just as true French subjects, without being required to take no letters of declaration of naturalization.

According to the 19th-century historian Francis Parkman:

Spanish civilization crushed the Indian; English civilization scorned and neglected him; French civilization embraced and cherished him

— Francis Parkman.

In many instance, French officials adopted Indian habits in order to gain their support. The French government officials and tribal sovereignty had an exchange program between Native children and French children that helped build diplomacy among the two groups, known as "métis". The Baron de Saint-Castin was adopted by an Abenaki tribe and married a native girl. Governor Frontenac danced and sang war songs at an Indian council, while Daniel Liénard de Beaujeu fought bare-chested and covered with war paints at the battle against Braddock. Natives also adopted French habits, like chief Kondiaronk who wanted to be buried in his uniform of captain or Kateri Tekakwitha who became a Catholic Saint.

French settlers and natives were allied in every conflict preceding the Seven Years' War: Father Rale's War, King George's War, Father Le Loutre's War. Intermarriages were also frequent in New France, giving rise to the Métis people.

== Seven Years' War ==
Map showing the 1750 possessions of Britain (pink), France (blue), and Spain (orange) in contemporary Canada and the United States.

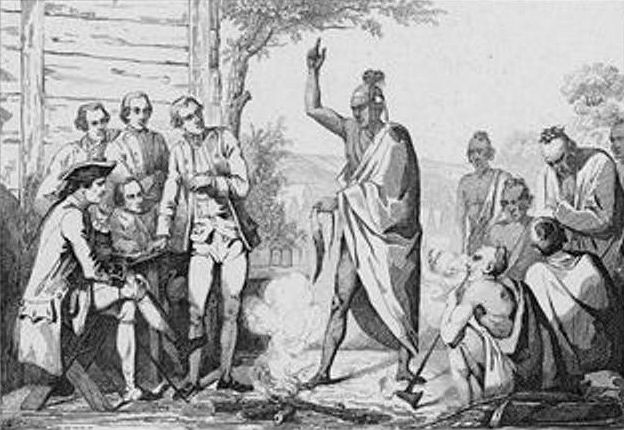
Conference between the French and Indigenous leaders around a ceremonial fire by Émile Louis Vernier

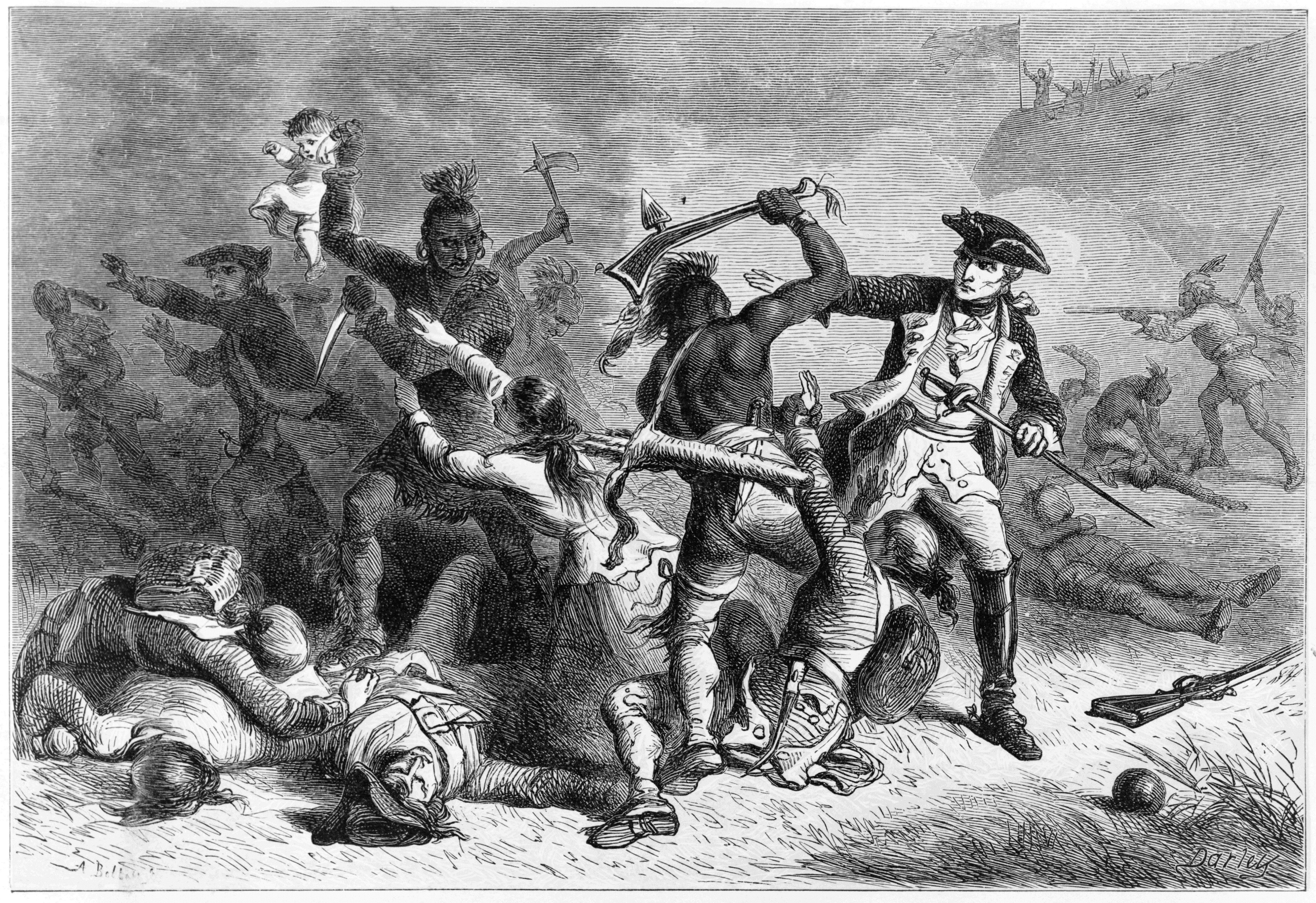
Montcalm trying to stop Native Americans from attacking British soldiers and civilians as they leave Fort William Henry.

In North America in the 18th century, the British outnumbered the French 20 to 1, a situation that urged France to ally with the majority of the First Nations. According to one French observer:

All the Indian nations were called together and invited to join and assist the French to repulse the British who came to drive them out of the land they were then in possession of.

At the beginning of the conflict, despite the disproportion of the forces involved, the French and their allies managed to inflict defeats to the British, such as the Battle of Fort Necessity or the Battle of the Monongahela. Following the capture of Fort William Henry, the Marquis de Montcalm agreed to let the British withdraw with full honours of war - a civility that was not understood by some natives who massacred the British and their camp followers on their way to Fort Edward.

Facing major defeats in the hands of Britain's allies on the European theater of the war and with its navy unable to match the Royal Navy, France was unable to properly supply and support the Canadiens and their indigenous allies. Britain had a string of successes, especially with the Battle of Fort Niagara, and the Franco-Indian alliance started to unravel. At the same time, the British were making promises of support and protection to the natives. Finally, Quebec fell in September following the Battle of the Plains of Abraham.

At the conclusion of the Seven Years' War in 1763, New France was divided with Canada going to the British and Louisiana to the Spaniards.

== Later history ==
Long after the extinction of New France in 1763, Franco-Indian communities would persist, practicing the Catholic faith, speaking French and using French names. From the Saint Lawrence to the Mississippi, cosmopolitan French communities accommodated Indians and Blacks.

During the American War of Independence and the onset of the Franco-American alliance, the French would again combine with Indian troops, as in the Battle of Kiekonga in 1780 under Augustin de La Balme.

In 1869 and 1885, Louis Riel led two Métis revolts against the Canadian government, known as the Red River Rebellion and the North-West Rebellion. The revolts were suppressed and Riel executed.

== See also ==
- Foreign alliances of France
- French and Indian War
- Kahnawake surnames
- French colonization of the Americas
