= Franco-Polish alliance =

1921 alliance between France and Poland

The Franco-Polish Alliance was the military alliance between Poland and France that was active between the early 1920s and the outbreak of the Second World War. The initial agreements were signed in February 1921 and formally took effect in 1923. During the interwar period the alliance with Poland was one of the cornerstones of French foreign policy.

== Background ==
During the France-Habsburg rivalry, which began in the 16th century, France tried to find allies to the east of Austria, hoping to ally with Poland. Polish King Jan III Sobieski also had the intention to ally with France against the threat of Austria, but the greater threat posed by the Muslim-led Ottoman Empire made him fight along with Austria for the Christian cause in the Battle of Vienna. In the 18th century, Poland was partitioned by Russia, Prussia and Austria, but Napoleon recreated the Polish state in the Duchy of Warsaw. With the rise of a united German Empire in the 19th century, France and Poland found a new common enemy.

== Interwar period ==
During the Polish–Soviet War of 1920, France, one of the most active supporters of Poland, sent the French Military Mission to Poland to aid the Polish army. In early February in Paris, three pacts were discussed by Polish Chief of State Józef Piłsudski and French President Alexandre Millerand: political, military and economic.

The political alliance was signed there on February 19, 1921 by Polish Minister of Foreign Affairs Count Eustachy Sapieha and French Minister of Foreign Affairs Aristide Briand, in the background of the negotiations that ended the Polish–Soviet War by the Treaty of Riga. The agreement assumed a common foreign policy, the promotion of bilateral economical contacts, the consultation of new pacts concerning Central and Eastern Europe and assistance in case one of the signatories became a victim of an "unprovoked" attack. As such, it was a defensive alliance. The secret military pact was signed two days later, on February 21, 1921, and clarified that the agreement was aimed at possible threats from both Germany and the Soviet Union. An attack on Poland would make France keep lines of communication free and Germany in check but not require it to send troops or to declare war. Both political and military pacts were legally not in force until the economic pact was ratified, which occurred on August 2, 1923.

The alliance was further extended by the Franco–Polish Warrant Agreement, signed on October 16, 1925 in Locarno, as part of the Locarno Treaties. The new treaty subscribed all previously-signed Polish–French agreements to the system of mutual pacts of the League of Nations.

The alliance was closely tied with the Franco-Czechoslovak Alliance. France's alliances with Poland and Czechoslovakia were aimed at deterring Germany from the use of force to achieve a revision of the postwar settlement and ensuring that German forces would be confronted with significant combined strength of its neighbours. Although Czechoslovakia had a significant economy and industry and Poland had a strong army, the French–Polish–Czechoslovak triangle never reached its full potential. Czechoslovak foreign policy, under Edvard Beneš, avoided signing a formal alliance with Poland, which would force Czechoslovakia to take sides in Polish–German territorial disputes. Czechoslovakia's influence was weakened by the doubts of its allies as to the trustworthiness of its army, and Poland's influence was undermined by fighting between supporters and opponents of Józef Piłsudski. France's reluctance to invest in its allies' industry (especially Poland's), improve trade relations by buying their agricultural products and share military expertise further weakened the alliance.

In the 1930s, the alliance remained mostly inactive and its only effect was to keep the French Military Mission to Poland, which had worked with the Polish General Staff ever since the Polish–Soviet War of 1919–1920. However, with the German threat becoming increasingly visible in the latter part of the decade, both countries started to seek a new pact to guarantee the independence of all contracting parties and military co-operation in case of a war with Germany.

== 1939 ==
Finally, a new alliance started to be formed in 1939. The Kasprzycki–Gamelin Convention was signed May 19, 1939 in Paris. It was named after Polish Minister of War Affairs General Tadeusz Kasprzycki and Commander of the French Army Maurice Gamelin. The military convention was army-to-army, not state-to-state, and was not in force legally, as it was dependent on signing and ratification of the political convention. It obliged both armies to provide help to each other in case of a war with Germany. In May, Gamelin promised a "bold relief offensive" within three weeks of a German attack.

The treaty was ratified by France on September 4, 1939, on the fourth day of German offensive on Poland.

However, France provided only token help to Poland during the war in the form of the Saar Offensive, which has often been considered an example of Western betrayal. However, the political convention was the basis of the recreation of the Polish Army in France.

Piotr Zychowicz quoted the memoirs of the French ambassador to Poland, Léon Noël, who wrote as early as October 1938, "It is of utmost importance that we remove from our obligations everything that would deprive French government the freedom of decision on the day when Poland finds itself in war with Germany". Foreign Minister Georges Bonnet reassured Noel by writing that "our agreement with Poland is full of gaps, needed to keep our country away from war".

== See also ==
- Anglo-Polish alliance
- Cordon sanitaire
- Diplomatic history of World War II
- Foreign alliances of France
- International relations (1919–1939)
- Phoney War
- Polish Army in France (1939–40)
- Western betrayal
- Why Die for Danzig?
