= Stresa Front =

1935 agreement between France, Italy, and Britain

Coordinates: 45°53′47.1″N 8°31′33.6″E

States of the Stresa Conference (blue) against Nazi Germany (brown)

The Stresa Front was an agreement made in Stresa, a town on the banks of Lake Maggiore in Italy, between French prime minister Pierre-Étienne Flandin (with Pierre Laval), British prime minister Ramsay MacDonald, and Italian prime minister Benito Mussolini on 14 April 1935. Practically, the Stresa Front was an alliance between France, Italy, and the United Kingdom, aimed against Nazi Germany.

Formally called the Final Declaration of the Stresa Conference, its aim was to reaffirm the Locarno Treaties and to declare that the independence of Austria "would continue to inspire their common policy". The signatories also agreed to resist any future attempt by the Germans to change the Treaty of Versailles. A factor in the Abyssinia Crisis, it encouraged Italian imperial ambitions, motivated by the perception that France and Britain would not intervene if Italy attacked Ethiopia. The Stresa Front began to collapse after the UK signed the Anglo-German Naval Agreement in June 1935, in which Germany was given permission to increase the size of its navy. The Front broke down completely after the Italian invasion of Ethiopia in October 1935.

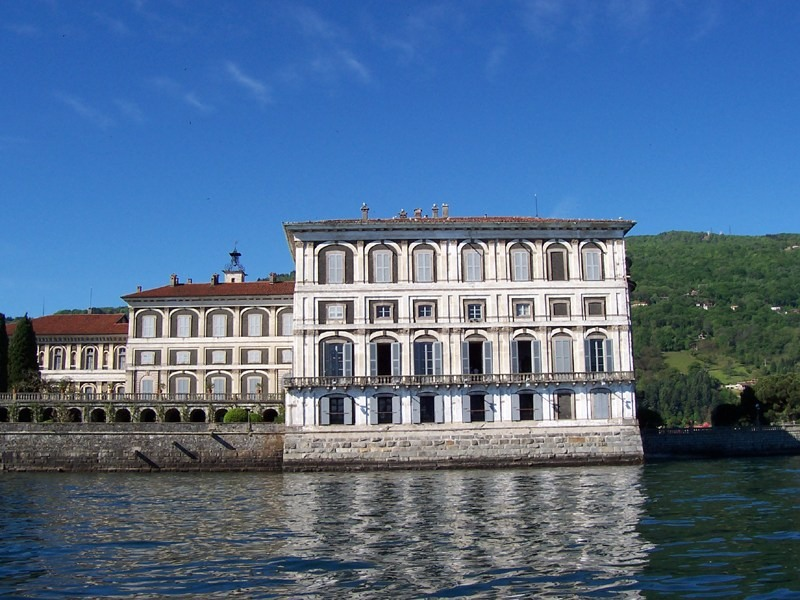
The conference venue: the Palazzo Borromeo on Isola Bella, one of the Borromean islands of Lake Maggiore in (Northern Italy)

Italy had already made an agreement with the Soviet Union directed against Germany in 1933, known as the Italo-Soviet Pact.

== Background ==
The Stresa Front was triggered by Germany's declaration of its intention to build up an air force, increase the size of the army to 36 divisions (500,000 men) and introduce conscription, in March 1935. All of these actions were direct violations of the Treaty of Versailles, which limited the size of the German Army to 100,000 men, forbade conscription in Germany and prohibited a German air force.

The Stresa Front was in many ways the work of Sir Robert Vansittart, of the British diplomatic corps. Vansittart was strongly against appeasement, and strongly for containing Germany. This had the practical effect of conceding to Italian desires in Ethiopia in an attempt to contain the Nazis. Italy was of crucial strategic importance in controlling Germany. Its geographic location made it well suited for a defence of Austria, which Italy had in fact done in the July Putsch of 1934, by sending four divisions to the Italian-Austrian border to prevent the Nazis from taking power. Further, with Italy against Germany, the Germans would be required to split their forces to guard their southern border, weakening their forces along the French and Belgian borders.

== Conference ==
Vansittart arranged for a four-day conference to take place in Stresa, starting on 11 April 1935. Vansittart proved to be the driving force behind the Conference, even though he had some obstacles to overcome first. Much to the chagrin of Italy and France, the British Sir John Simon had met with German officials in Berlin shortly before the Stresa Conference. Vansittart spent considerable effort assuaging Italian and French concerns that the British might seek rapprochement with the Nazis; he achieved this in part by sharing diplomatic intelligence gained during Simon's meeting in Berlin.

The issue of Abyssinia (now Ethiopia) bedevilled the conference. Italy had asked Britain to bring along an expert on the subject, which it did. But in trying to solve the question of Europe, the Abyssinia issue had been sidelined, leading up to the Conference. The resulting accounts of the issue vary: the official records make no mention of Abyssinia, though anecdotal evidence (perhaps invented by Mussolini) indicated that Mussolini had attempted to limit the Stresa Front's range to Europe, thereby allowing free rein in Abyssinia. Regardless, it appears that the British and Italians had not communicated properly: Italy thought it would have free rein in Abyssinia, and Britain thought it had made clear that Abyssinia was off limits. The issue would come to a head in the autumn of 1935.

== Dissolution ==
The Abyssinia Crisis proved to be the stress test that the Stresa Front could not withstand. Abyssinia had been invaded by Italy in the First Italo-Ethiopian War in 1895, which had been a humiliating defeat for the Italians. Italy had never truly forgotten its ambitions of controlling Ethiopia, and Mussolini saw an expansionist opportunity. Baron Vansittart received much contemporary criticism for his role in organizing the Front, given that in trying to contain Germany, Britain and France had now effectively appeased Italy, by allowing it a free hand in Ethiopia. The short-lived Front collapsed completely with the Italian invasion of Abyssinia in October 1935.

Mussolini had long held ambitions of controlling Abyssinia and was enraged by the signing of the Anglo-German Naval Agreement without being informed beforehand. Mussolini had held back on his invasion plans to avoid alienating his allies, especially since Ethiopia bordered French Somaliland and British Somaliland. However, he felt betrayed by Britain and so decided that there was no reason against the invasion. He also believed that the agreement violated the Stresa Front.

On 6 January 1936, Mussolini told German Ambassador Ulrich von Hassell that he would not object to Germany taking Austria as a satellite state if it maintained its independence. On 22 February, Mussolini then agreed to Hitler's remilitarization of the Rhineland and stated that Italy would not honour the Locarno Treaty if the remilitarization occurred.

The Stresa conference was judged a British "fiasco" by Vansittart:

With this fiasco we lost Abyssinia, we lost Austria, we created the Axis, and we made the coming war with Germany inevitable.

== See also ==
- Anschluss annexation of Austria by Germany in 1938
- Locarno Treaties
