= Consulate-General of France, Cape Town =

Consular representation of the French Republic in South Africa

Consulate General of France in Cape Town Consulat de France au Cap
- Consulat
- Location: Cape Town, South Africa
- Address: 78 Queen Victoria Street
- Coordinates: 33.927814757911044°S 18.41507450731984°E
- Ambassador: Sophie Bel
- Website: https://lecap.consulfrance.org/-English-

The Consulate General of France in Cape Town is a consular representation of the French Republic in South Africa. The consular district includes the three Cape provinces, Prince Edward Islands and the British territory of Saint Helena (Saint Helena Island, Tristan Da Cunha Archipelago, Ascension Island). Three honorary Consuls, in Port Elizabeth, East London and Saint Helena depend on the Consulate of Cape Town. People living in Lesotho or in one in the six other South African provinces depend on the French Consulate General of Johannesburg.
The Consulate General is currently located on 78 Queen Victoria Street.

Under the authority of the Ministry of Foreign Affairs and International Development (France), the Consulate General of France is responsible for the protection and administrative affairs of French nationals settled or traveling within South Africa.

The Consulate General provides many services to the French community and those who desire to travel to France.

== History ==
The French Consulate General in Cape Town, according to the archives of the French Ministry of Foreign Affairs is, the oldest in Southern Africa. In 1803, Napoleon Bonaparte nominated a certain Gaillande "superintendent of trade relations in Cape Town", equivalent to what is now the rank of Vice-Consul. His responsibility was to provide supplies to the naval division of Rear-Admiral Linois. Gaillande stayed in this post until January 10, 1806, the date when Cape Town was taken over by the English.

A Consular Agency, dependent of the French Consulate General in London, was recreated after the fall of the First Empire in June 1817 and Count des Escotais was appointed. The latter began his job on August 3, 1818. The Consular Agency was erected as a Consulate in November 1818.

The first civil status act registered in the French Consulate of Cape Town was on January 6, 1871, between Charles Marie Ernest de la Cornillière, from Cape Town and Miss Stella Hendrina Hampt, from Paarl.

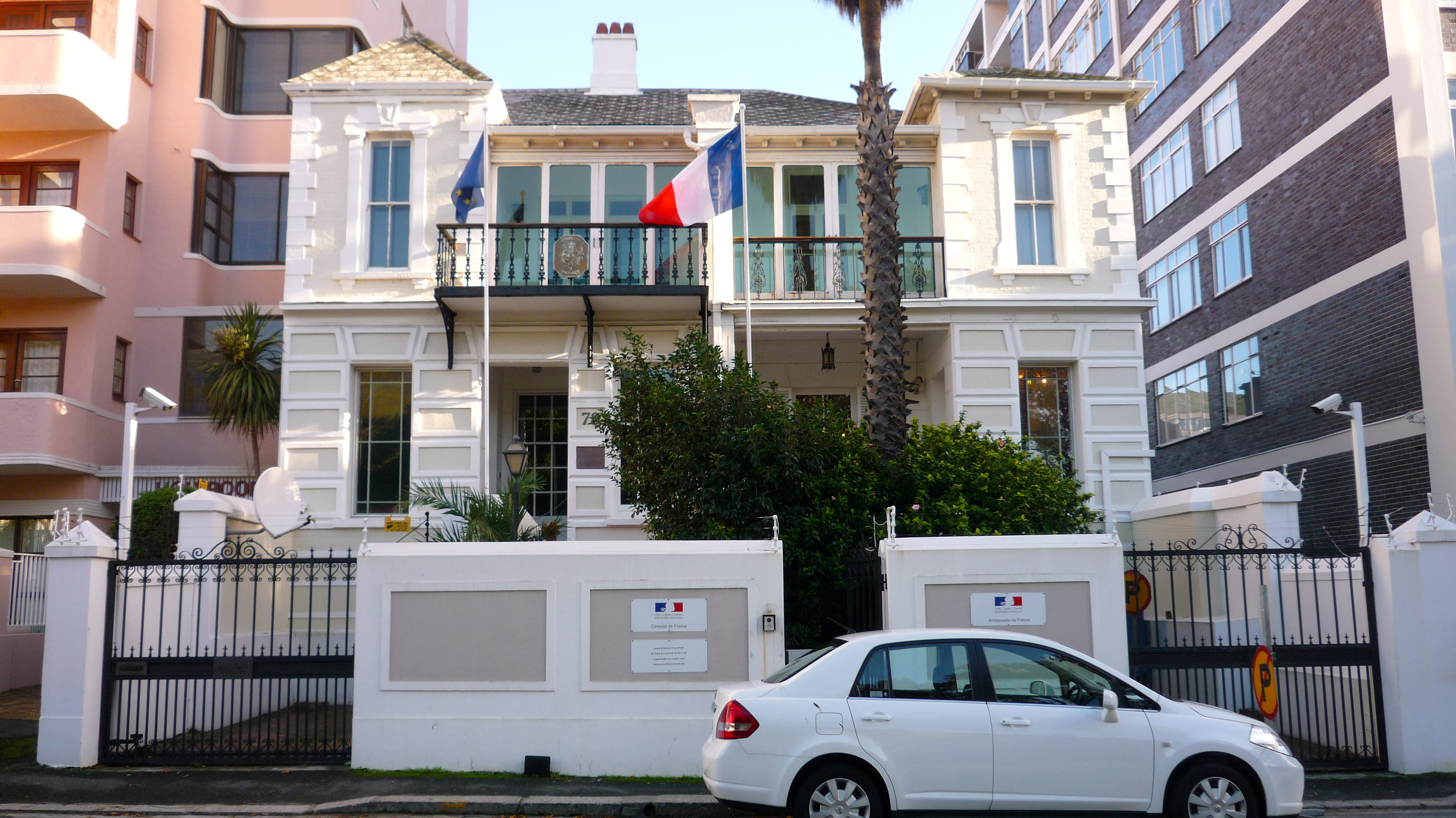
The French Consulate of Cape Town in 2014

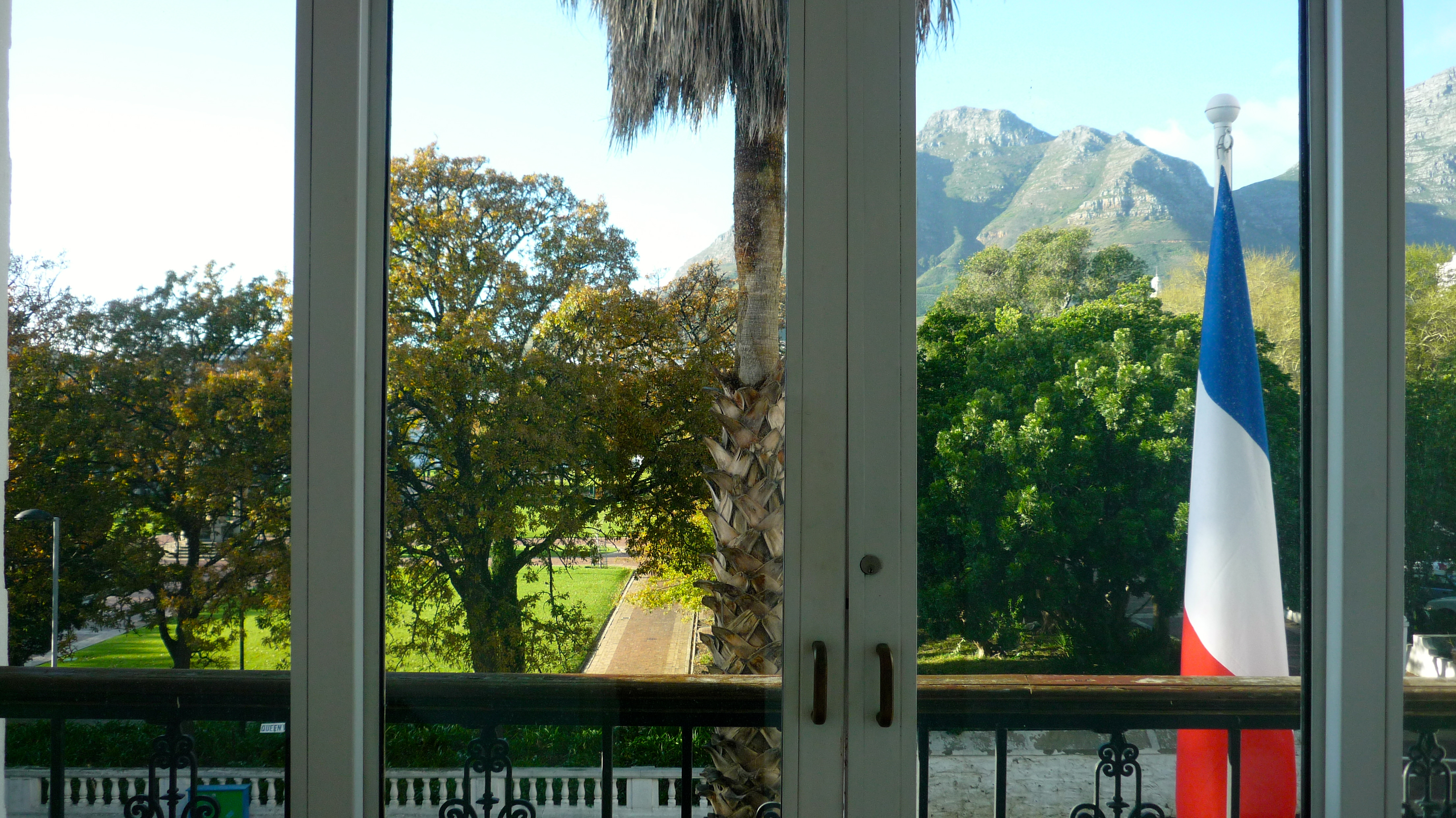
View from the main balcony

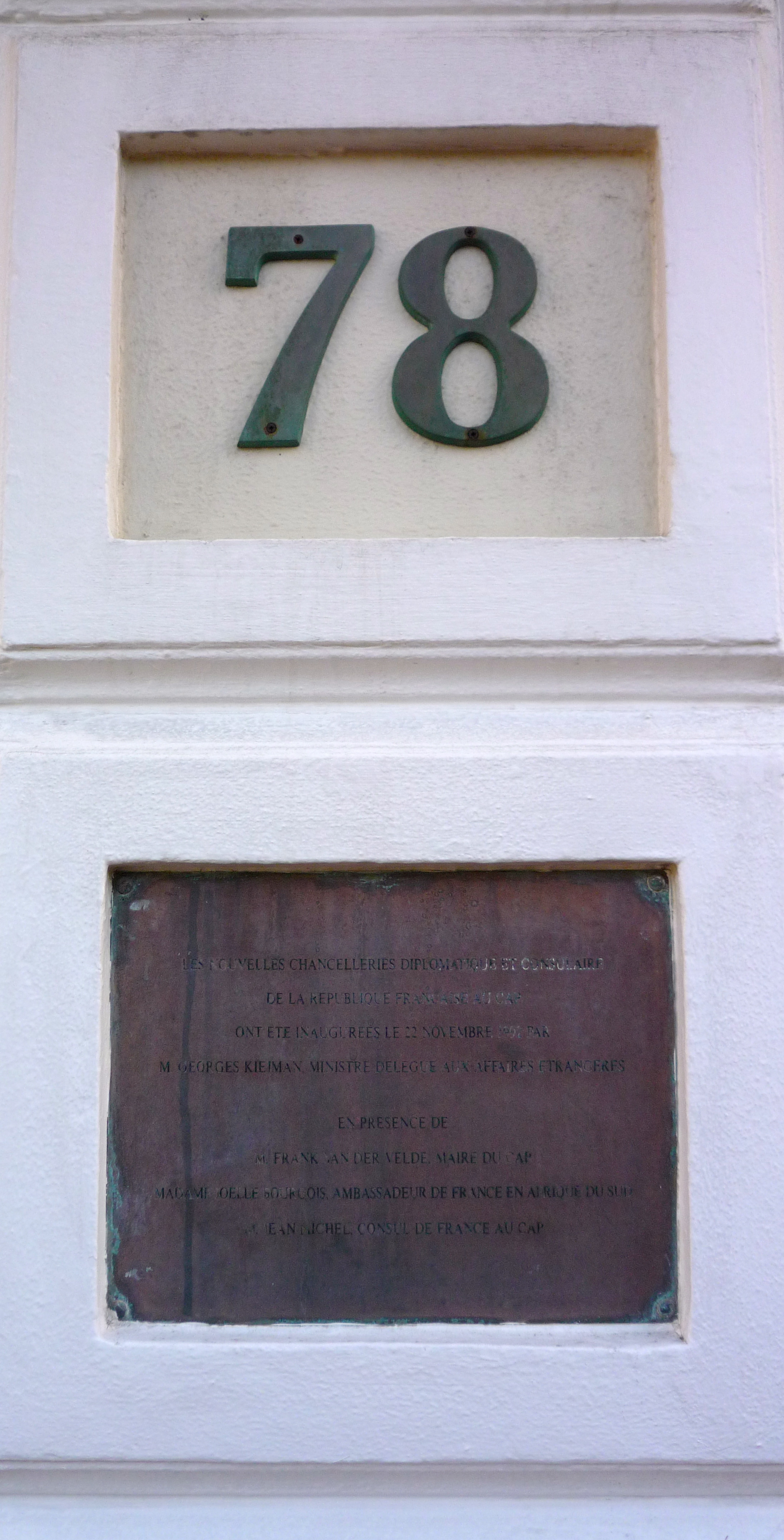
78 Queen Victoria Street

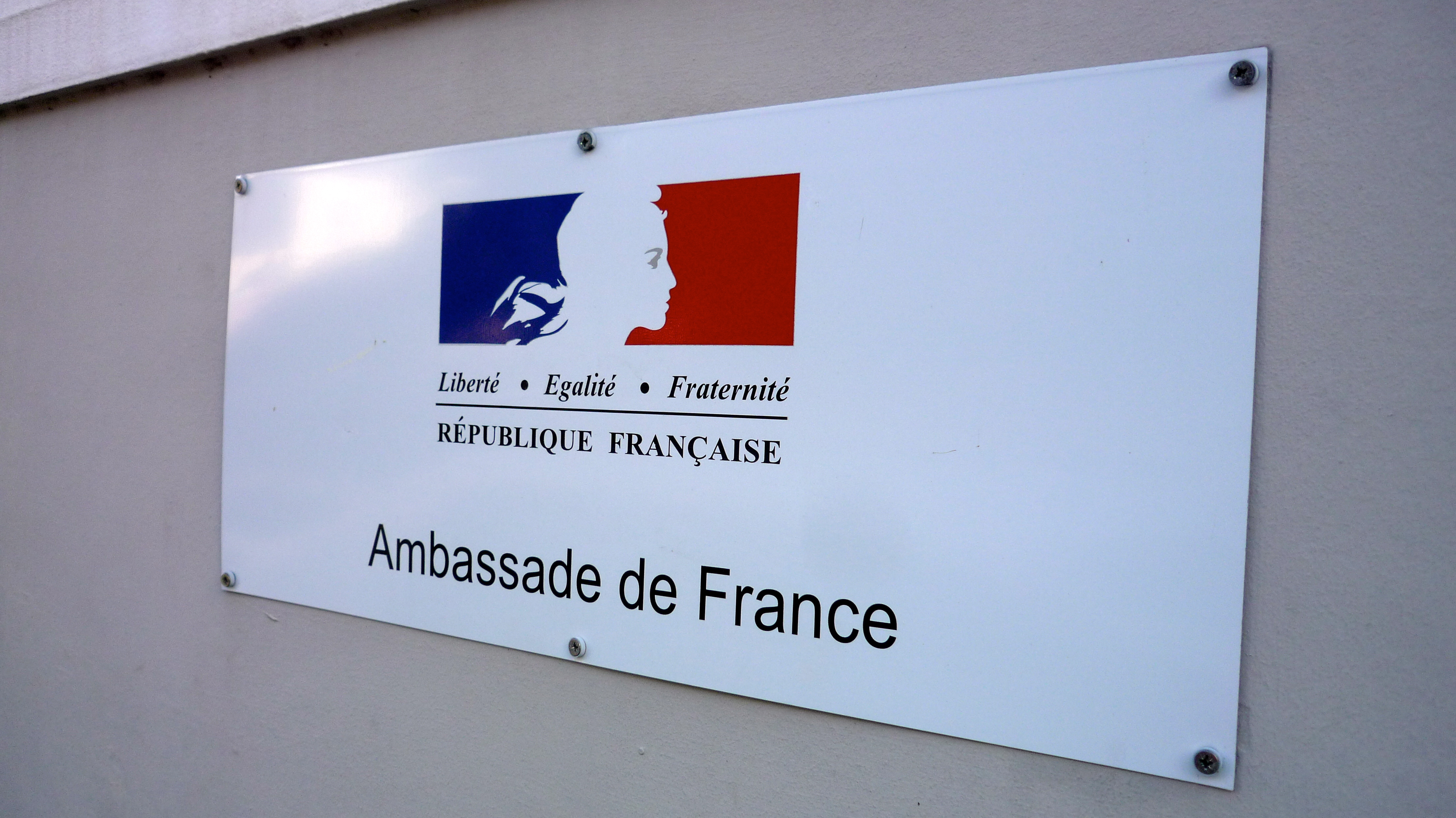
Main entrance from Queen Victoria Street

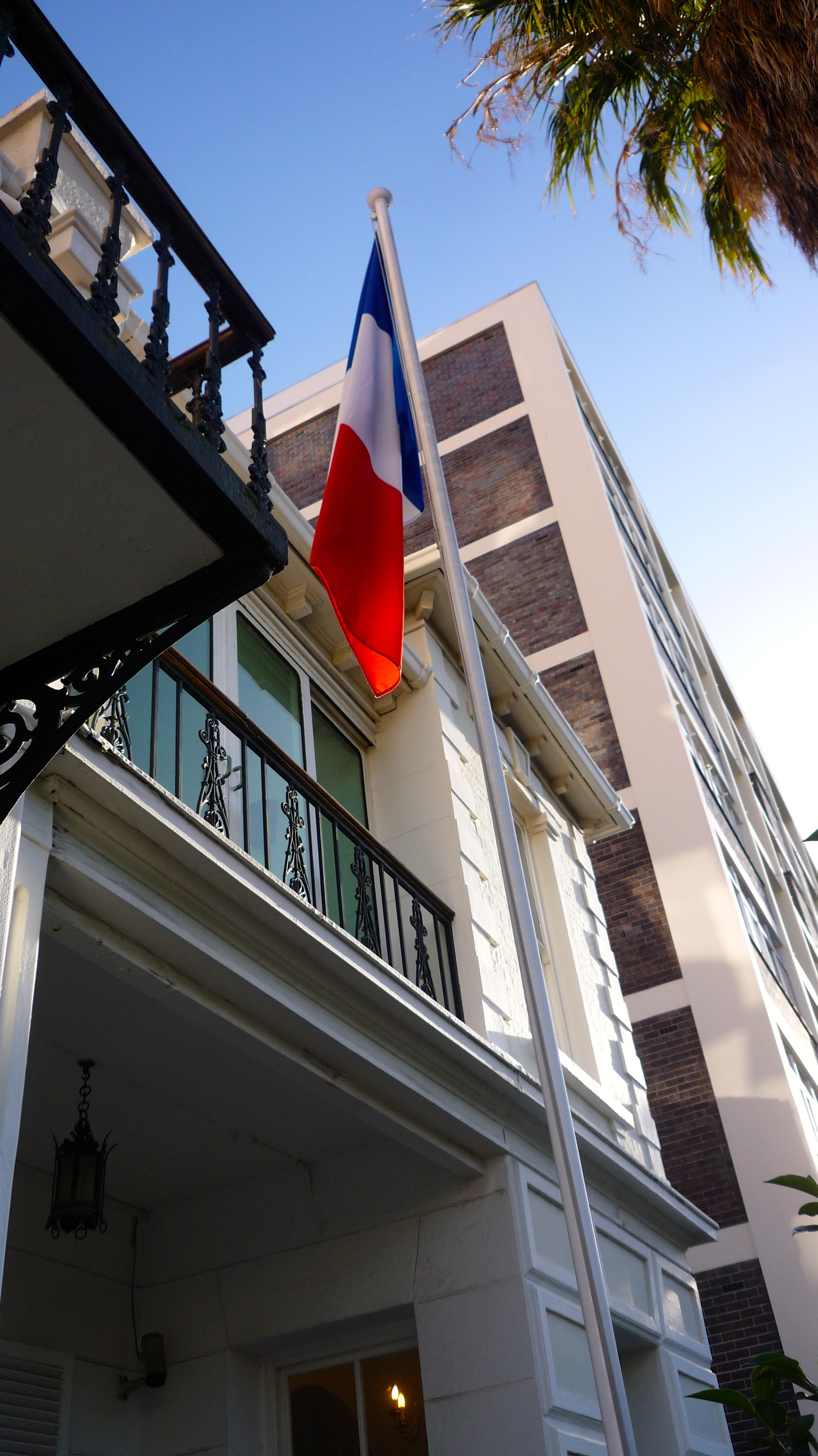

== Consular services ==
=== Visas service ===
A visa allows a foreigner and non-European Union member, to enter and travel temporarily within French territory.

=== The Chancellery ===
The chancellery provides all of administrative services to French citizens abroad. It is necessary to contact the chancellery as soon as your documents have been lost or stolen, regarding the renewal of passports or to obtain scholarships, grants, or other scholar financial aides. This service establishes itself as a direct interface between migrants and their nation of origin.

=== Cultural services ===
The Alliance Française in Cape Town possess a cultural service department that satisfies the following missions:

- Encourage French cultural productions by helping professionals and artists in South Africa,
- Promote the French educational system by managing the careers of French teachers, professors, and research workers in the South Africa, establishing guidance for students and parents, organizing national exams,
- Support all possible efforts towards artistic events, cultural establishments, and higher education.

== France Abroad ==
=== The Consul ===
The current Consul General of France is Sophie Bel, incumbent since 2023.

Consuls of France in Cape Town	Dates
Émile Samuel Rolland	? –1872
Richard Sonthen	1872–1884
Comte de Tunemy	1884–1887
Charles de Coutouly	1888–1888
Joseph Napoleon Perrette	1892–1894
Marie Jacques Achille Raffray	1894–1904
Fernand Aymot	1904–1905
Louis-Pierre Vossion	1905–1906
Adrien Laurent Cochelet	1906–1910
Émile Jore	1911–1915
Consul de Belgique, Gérant du Consulat-général de France au Cap	1920–1921
Paul-Marie Suzor	1921–1922
Louis de Francquevilly	1922–1923
Paul Suzor	1923–1925
Marie Charles de Francqueville	1923–1923
Henri Soiray	1925–1930
Emile Feer	1930–1932
Maurice de Semouin	1932–1938
Marc Édouard Batezat	1938–1941
Pierre Armand	1941–1942
Louis Morand	1942–1944
André Brénac	1944–1948
Eugène Edmond Haimet	1948–1952
Guy de Coulhac	1953–1956
Claude Cansou	1956–1961
Max de Montalembert	1962–1965
Jean-Joseph Ortoli	1966–1968
Louis Pannier	1968–1971
Hubert Isnard	1971–1973
Gilbert Février	1973–1978
Marcel Fleury	1978–1982
Jean Biron	1982–1985
Gérard Perrolet	1985–1990
Jean Michel	1990–1993
Claude Berlioz	1993–1996
Jean-Christophe Belliard	1997–2001
Bruno Clerc	2001–2005
Jean-Luc Bodin	2005–2008
Denis François	2008–2009
Antoine Michon	2009–2013
Xavier d'Argœuves	2013–2017
Laurent Amar	2017–2020
Laurent Alberti	2020–2023
Sophie Bel	2020–present

=== Honorary Consuls ===
Three honorary Consuls, in Port Elizabeth, East London and Saint Helena depend on the Consulate of Cape Town.

=== French Presence ===
The Consulate General collaborates regularly with numerous French associations and organizations abroad.

=== The French community in Cape Town ===
As of December 2013, there are about 7300 French citizens in South Africa and 2804 living in Cape Town.

== See also ==
- List of diplomatic missions of France
- Foreign relations of France
