= France–Latvia relations =

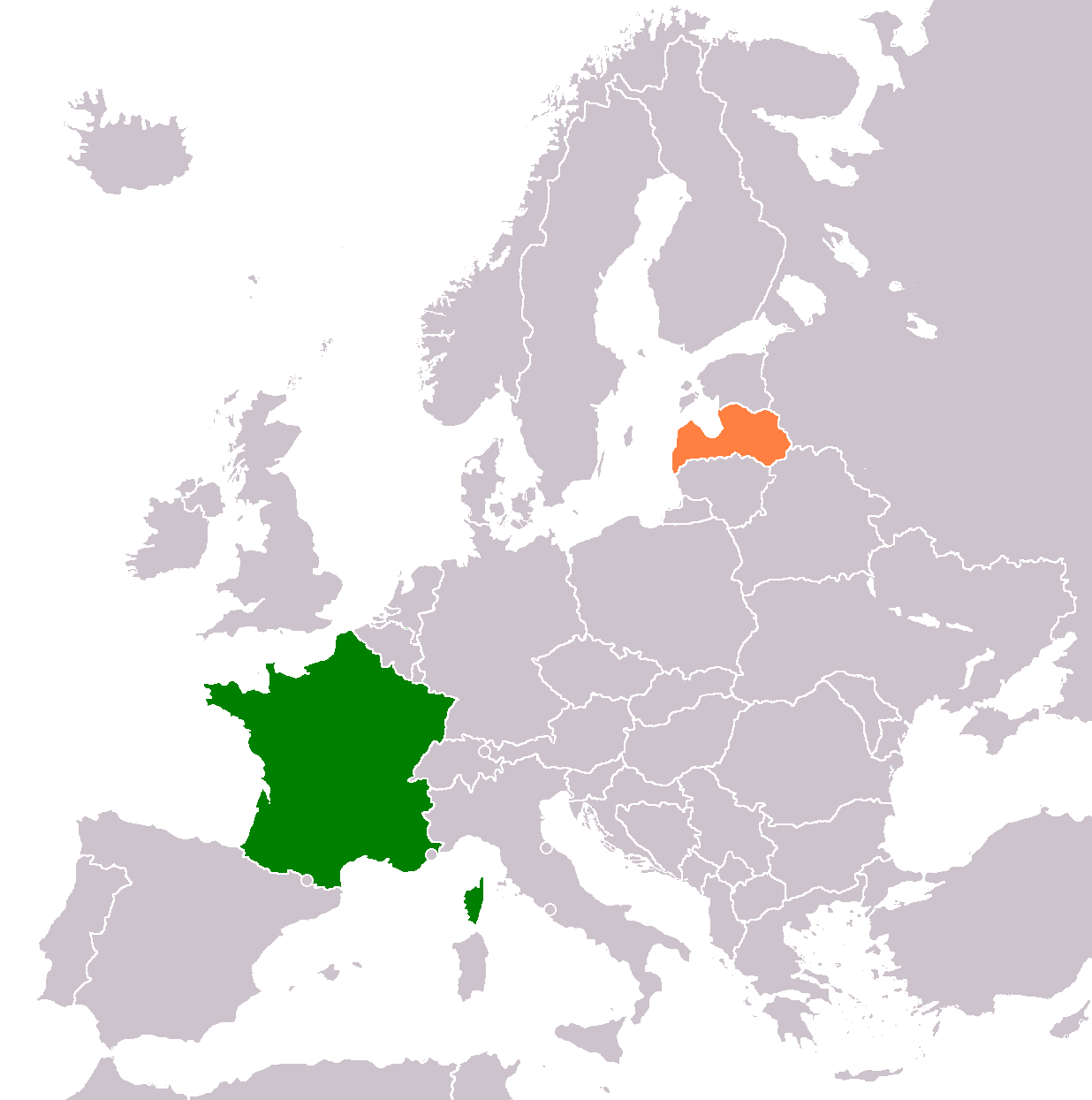

- France: Latvia

France–Latvia relations are the bilateral relations between France and Latvia. Both countries are full members of the Council of Europe, European Union, NATO and the Eurozone.

== History ==
France recognized Latvia on 26 January 1921. France never recognised the annexation of Latvia by the former Soviet Union. France re-recognized Latvia on 27 August 1991 and both established diplomatic relations on 30 August 1991.

Since 2008, Latvia is an observer on the Francophonie.

France and Latvia enjoy warm relations as part of France's relations with all the Baltic states. The countries have been strategic partners since an agreement was signed in Riga in May 2008. The plan was completed and ratified by a further agreement signed in 2012. In February 2017, the defense ministers of France and Latvia signed an international defense agreement in Paris.

The France-Latvia Economic Forum was held in Riga in May 2014. Another forum was held in Paris in October 2017.

In 2018, Latvia's centenary celebrations were held in both Latvia and France. An exhibition on Baltic symbolism was held at the Musée d'Orsay from April to July 2018. There is a French school in Riga called "Lycee Francais de Riga".

== High level visits ==
=== High-level visits from France to Latvia ===
- In May 1992 French President François Mitterrand was the first Western head of state to visit Latvia after the end of the Soviet regime.
- In 2001 French President Jacques Chirac paid a visit to Riga.
- In 2006 French President Jacques Chirac visited Riga as part of the NATO conference.
- On 21–22 May 2015, President François Hollande travelled to Riga to participate in the 2015 Eastern Partnership Summit. Side talks with German Chancellor Angela Merkel and Prime Minister of Greece Alexis Tsipras were held on Greek debt.
- On 29–30 September 2020, President Emmanuel Macron travelled to Riga and met with President Egils Levits and Prime Minister Arturs Krišjānis Kariņš.

=== High-level visits from Latvia to France ===
- In 2005 Latvian President Vaira Vika-Freiberga visited Paris and was a guest at the Elysee Palace.
- On 16 November 2016 visit of Latvian Foreign Minister Edgars Rinkēvičs to Paris on the occasion of 25 years of the establishment of diplomatic relations.
- On 17 April 2019, Prime Minister Krišjānis Kariņš in Strasbourg addressed the European Parliament, arguing that it was "useless" to just fight against the rise of populism, and that it was necessary in the first place to understand the grievances of people who listened to the promises of populists.
- On 1 December 2021, Prime Minister Krišjānis Kariņš met with President Emmanuel Macron and Mathias Cormann, Secretary General of the Organisation for Economic Co-operation and Development (OECD) in Paris.
- On 15 December 2023, President Edgars Rinkēvičs paid a working visit to Paris to meet with President Emmanuel Macron to discuss European security and the EU budget.
- On 25–28 July 2024, President Edgars Rinkēvičs attended the opening ceremony of the 2024 Summer Olympics in Paris.
- On 1 October 2024, Prime Minister Evika Siliņa attended the 70th-anniversary celebrations of the European Organization for Nuclear Research (CERN) in Cessy, near Geneva. During this visit, she toured the Compact Muon Solenoid (CMS) cavern and the Large Hadron Collider (LHC) tunnel. This event was significant as it marked a milestone in scientific collaboration and innovation.
- On 27 March 2025, Prime Minister Evika Siliņa attended a meeting of the "Coalition of the willing" in Paris hosted by President Macron.

== Resident diplomatic missions ==
- France has an embassy in Riga.
- Latvia has an embassy in Paris and 9 honorary consulates across the country (in Bordeaux, Calais, Lyon, Marseille, Nancy, Nantes, Saint-Étienne, Strasbourg and Toulouse).

== See also ==
- Foreign relations of France
- Foreign relations of Latvia
- EU-NATO relations
