= Foreign relations of France =

Diplomatic emblem is used by French diplomatic missions and consular posts abroad.

In the 19th century France built a new French colonial empire second only to the British Empire. It was humiliated in the Franco-Prussian War of 1870–71, which marked the rise of Germany to dominance in Europe. France allied with Great Britain and Russia and was on the winning side of the First World War. Although it was initially easily defeated early in the Second World War, Free France, through its Free French Forces and the Resistance, continued to fight against the Axis powers as an Allied nation and was ultimately considered one of the victors of the war, as the allocation of a French occupation zone in Germany and West Berlin testifies, as well as the status of permanent member of the United Nations Security Council. It fought losing colonial wars in Indochina (ending in 1954) and Algeria (ending in 1962). The Fourth Republic collapsed and the Fifth Republic began in 1958 to the present. Under Charles de Gaulle it tried to block American and British influence on the European community. Since 1945, France has been a founding member of the United Nations, of NATO, and of the European Coal and Steel Community (the European Union's predecessor). As a charter member of the United Nations, France holds one of the permanent seats in the Security Council and is a member of most of its specialized and related agencies.

France is also a founding member of the Union for the Mediterranean and the La Francophonie and plays a key role, both in regional and in international affairs.

On February 14, 2023, as part of their foreign policy in human rights, France showed its support for international justice by signing the Ljubljana-Hague Convention on International Cooperation in the Investigation and Prosecution of Genocide, Crimes against Humanity, War Crimes, and other International Crimes.

== Fifth Republic since 1981 ==
=== François Mitterrand: 1981–1995 ===
François Mitterrand, a Socialist, emphasized European unity and the preservation of France's special relationships with its former colonies in the face of "Anglo-Saxon influence." A part of the enacted policies was formulated in the Socialist Party's 110 Propositions for France, the electoral program for the 1981 presidential election. He had a warm and effective relationship with the conservative German Chancellor Helmut Kohl. They promoted French-German bilateralism in Europe and strengthened military cooperation between the two countries.

According to Wayne Northcutt, certain domestic circumstances helped shape Mitterrand's foreign policy in four ways: he needed to maintain a political consensus; he kept an eye on economic conditions; he believed in the nationalistic imperative for French policy; and he tried to exploit Gaullism and its heritage that is on political advantage.

=== Jacques Chirac ===
Chirac's foreign policy featured continuity. His most prominent move was a break with Washington. Along with his friend Vladimir Putin of Russia, Hu Jintao of China, and Gerhard Schröder of Germany, Chirac emerged as a leading voice against the Iraq War of 2003. They opposed George W. Bush (U.S.) and Tony Blair (Britain) during the organisation and deployment of a "Coalition of the willing" to forcibly remove the government of Iraq controlled by the Ba'ath Party under the dictatorship of Saddam Hussein. Despite British and American pressure, Chirac threatened to veto a resolution in the UN Security Council that would authorise the use of military force to rid Iraq of alleged weapons of mass destruction. He rallied other governments to his position. "Iraq today does not represent an immediate threat that justifies an immediate war", Chirac said on 18 March 2003. Future Prime Minister Dominique de Villepin acquired much of his popularity for his speech against the war at the United Nations (UN).

=== Nicolas Sarkozy ===
Shortly after taking office, President Sarkozy began negotiations with Colombian president Álvaro Uribe and the left-wing guerrilla FARC, regarding the release of hostages held by the rebel group, especially Franco-Colombian politician Íngrid Betancourt. According to some sources, Sarkozy himself asked for Uribe to release FARC's "chancellor" Rodrigo Granda. Furthermore, he announced on 24 July 2007, that French and European representatives had obtained the extradition of the Bulgarian nurses detained in Libya to their country. In exchange, he signed with Gaddafi security, health care and immigration pacts – and a $230 million (168 million euros) MILAN antitank missile sale. The contract was the first made by Libya since 2004, and was negotiated with MBDA, a subsidiary of EADS. Another 128 million euros contract would have been signed, according to Tripoli, with EADS for a TETRA radio system. The Socialist Party (PS) and the Communist Party (PCF) criticized a "state affair" and a "barter" with a "Rogue state". The leader of the PS, François Hollande, requested the opening of a parliamentary investigation.

On 8 June 2007, during the 33rd G8 summit in Heiligendamm, Sarkozy set a goal of reducing French CO_{2} emissions by 50% by 2050 in order to prevent global warming. He then pushed forward the important Socialist figure of Dominique Strauss-Kahn as European nominee to the International Monetary Fund (IMF). Critics alleged that Sarkozy proposed to nominate Strauss-Kahn as managing director of the IMF to deprive the Socialist Party of one of its more popular figures.

Sarkozy normalised what had been strained relations with NATO. In 2009, France again was a fully integrated NATO member. François Hollande has continued the same policy.

=== François Hollande ===
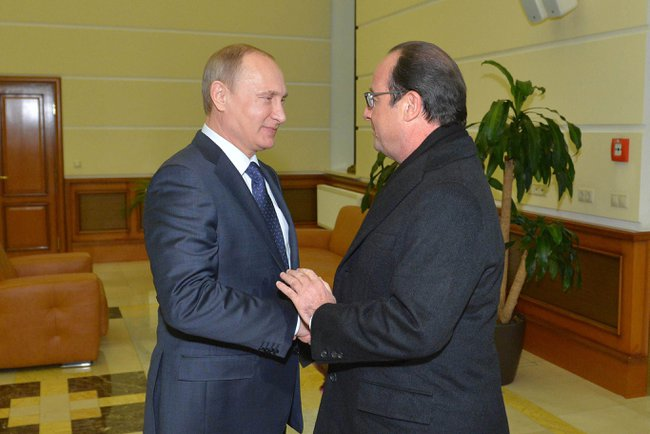
François Hollande and Vladimir Putin in December 2014

Socialist François Hollande won election in 2012 as president. He adopted a generally hawkish foreign-policy, in close collaboration with Germany in regard to opposing Russian moves against Ukraine, and in sending the military to fight radical Islamists in Africa. He took a hard line with regard to the Greek debt crisis. François Hollande launched two military operations in Africa: Operation Serval in Mali (the French armed forces stopped an Islamist takeover of Bamako, the nation's capital city); and Operation Sangaris (to restore peace there as tensions between different religious communities had turned into a violent conflict). France was also the first European nation to join the United States in bombing the Islamic State of Iraq and the Levant. Under President Hollande, France's stances on the civil war in Syria and Iran's nuclear program have been described as "hawkish".

=== Emmanuel Macron, 2017–present ===
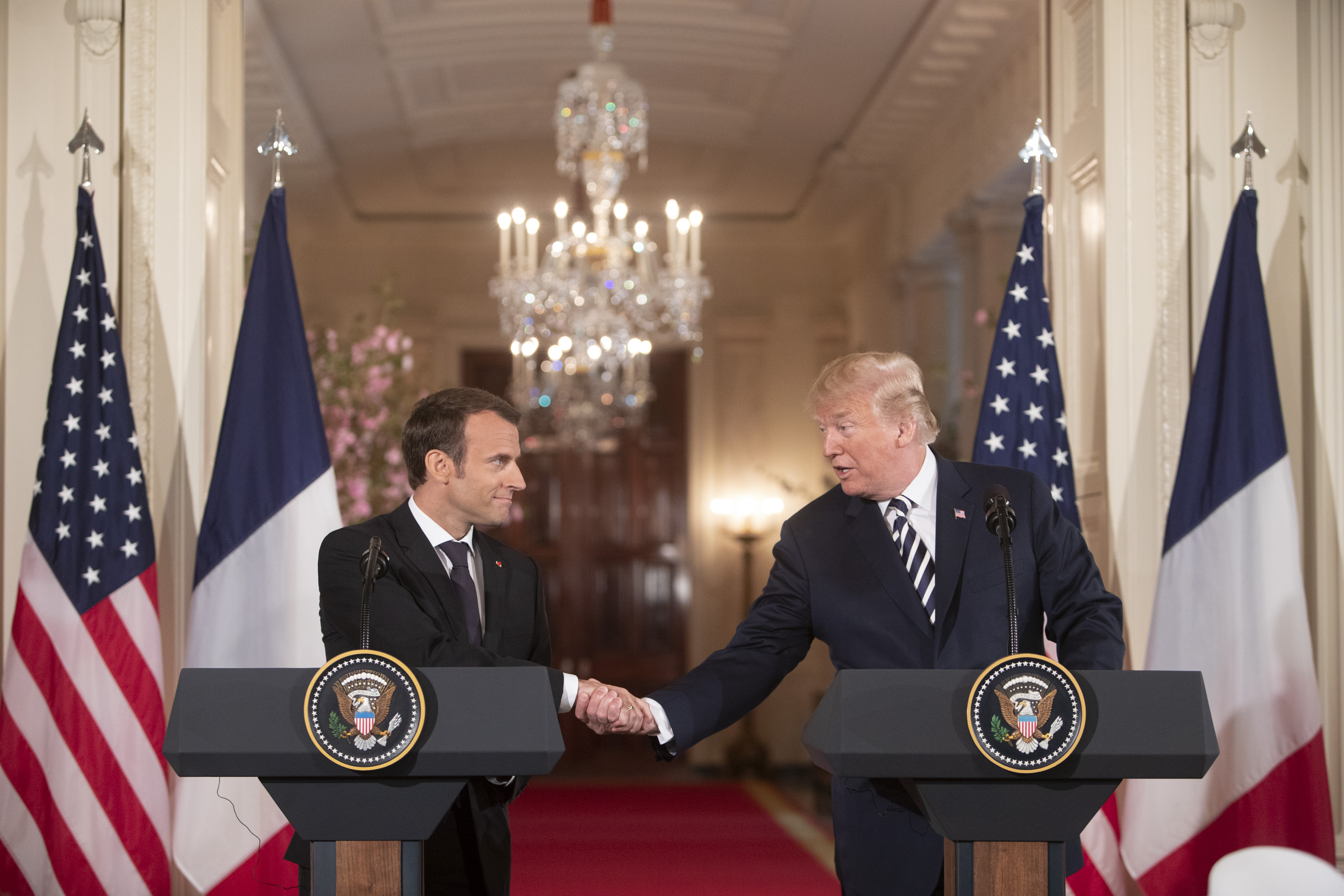
Emmanuel Macron and Donald Trump in April 2018

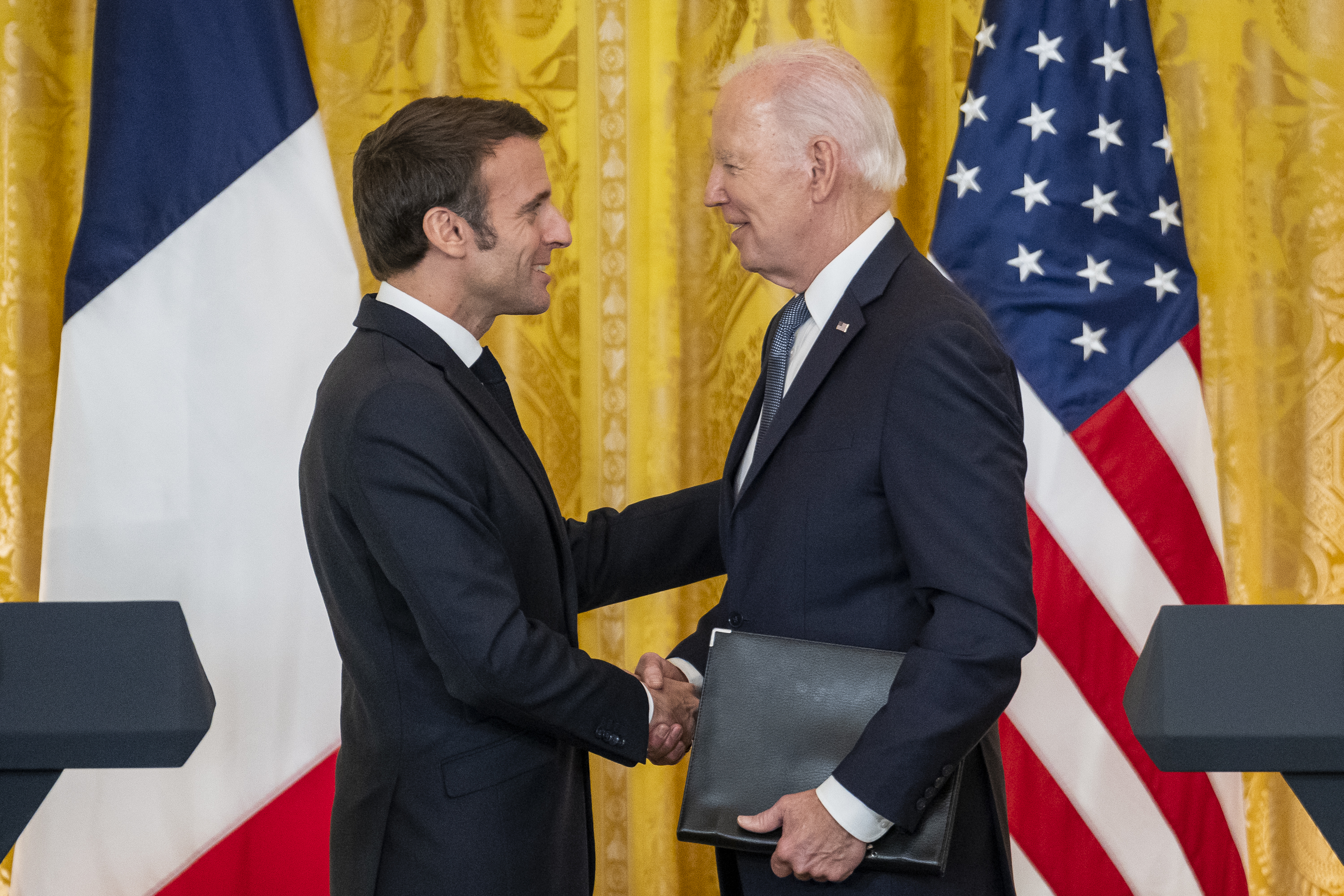
Emmanuel Macron and Joe Biden in December 2022

On 31 May 2022, due to the reforms pushed by the president and perceived lack of recognition, the French diplomats went on a strike for the first time in 20 years. This was bad timing for President Emmanuel Macron as France was holding the EU Presidency until the end of June.

=== Reputation ===
Sophie Meunier in 2017 analyzed the causes of decline in France's former reputation as a major player in world affairs:

France does not have as much relative global clout as it used to. Decolonization ... diminished France's territorial holdings and therefore its influence. Other countries acquired nuclear weapons and built up their armies. The message of "universal" values carried by French foreign policy has encountered much resistance, as other countries have developed following a different political trajectory than the one preached by France. By the 1990s, the country had become, in the words of Stanley Hoffmann, an "ordinary power, neither a basket case nor a challenger." Public opinion, especially in the United States, no longer sees France as an essential power....[However in 2015 France] mattered in world environmental affairs with....the Paris Agreement, a global accord to reduce carbon emissions.

== International organization participation ==
ACCT, AfDB, AsDB, Australia Group, BDEAC, BIS, CCC, CDB (non-regional), CE, CERN, EAPC, EBRD, ECA (associate), ECE, ECLAC, EIB, EMU, ESA, ESCAP, EU, FAO, FZ, G-5, G-7, G-10, IADB, IAEA, IBRD, ICAO, ICC, ICC, ICRM, IDA, IEA, IFAD, IFC, IFRCS, IHO, ILO, IMF, International Maritime Organization, Inmarsat, InOC, Intelsat, Interpol, IOC, IOM, ISO, ITU, ITUC, MINURSO, MIPONUH, MONUC, NAM (guest), NATO, NEA, NSG, OAS (observer), OECD, OPCW, OSCE, PCA, SPC, UN, UN Security Council, UNCTAD, UNESCO, UNHCR, UNIDO, UNIFIL, UNIKOM, UNITAR, UNMIBH, UNMIK, UNOMIG, UNRWA, UNTSO, UNU, UPU, WADB (nonregional), WEU, WFTU, WHO, WIPO, WMO, WToO, WTrO, Zangger Committee

== International border disputes ==
- Madagascar claims Bassas da India, Europa Island, Glorioso Islands and Juan de Nova Island
- Comoros claims Mayotte
- Mauritius claims Tromelin Island
- territorial dispute on the boundary between Suriname and French Guiana
- territorial claim in Antarctica (Adélie Land) under the Antarctic Treaty System
- Matthew Island and Hunter Island east of New Caledonia claimed by France and Vanuatu

== Middle East ==
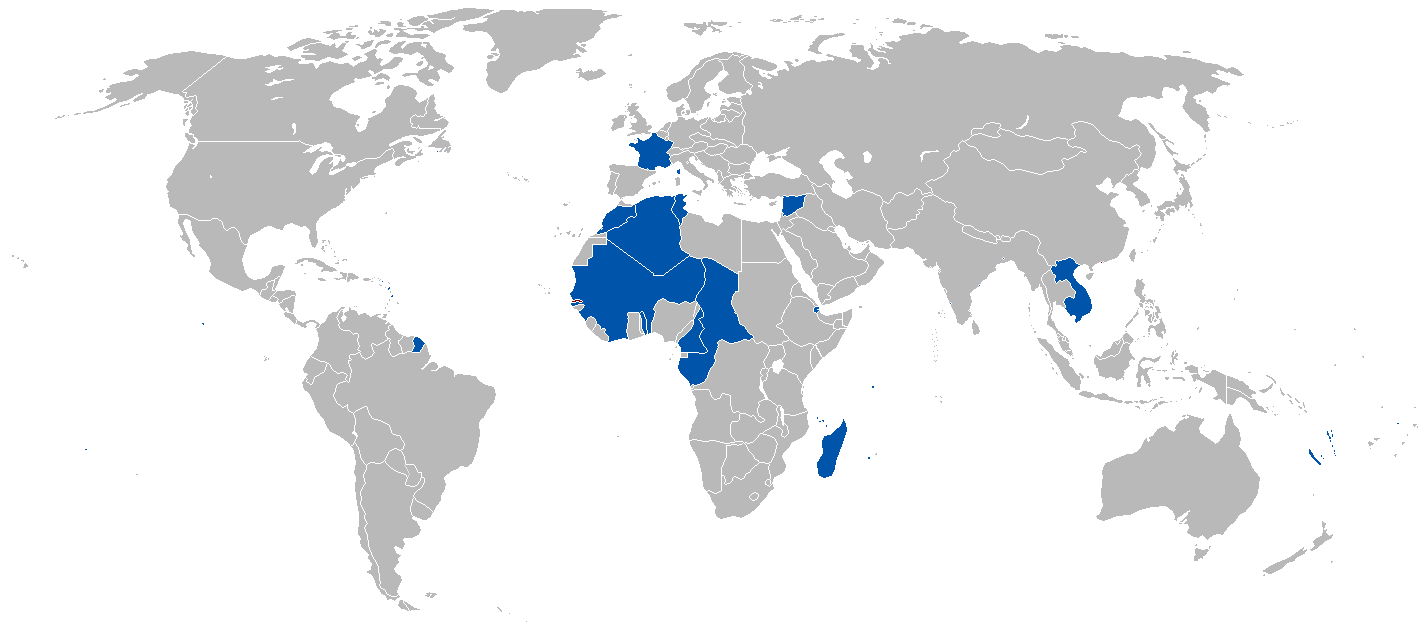
The French colonial empire in 1920

France established relations with the Middle East during the reign of Louis XIV. To keep Austria from intervening into its plans regarding Western Europe he lent limited support to the Ottoman Empire, though the victories of Prince Eugene of Savoy destroyed these plans. In the nineteenth century France together with Great Britain tried to strengthen the Ottoman Empire, the now "Sick man of Europe", to resist Russian expansion, culminating in the Crimean War.

France also pursued close relations with the semi-autonomous Egypt. In 1869 Egyptian workers -under the supervision of France- completed the Suez Canal. A rivalry emerged between France and Britain for control of Egypt, and eventually Britain emerged victorious by buying out the Egyptian shares of the company before the French had time to act.

After the unification of Germany in 1871, Germany successfully attempted to co-opt France's relations with the Ottomans. In World War I the Ottoman Empire joined the Central Powers, and was defeated by France and Britain. After the collapse of the Ottoman Empire France and Britain divided the Middle East between themselves. France received Syria and Lebanon.

=== 1945–1958 ===
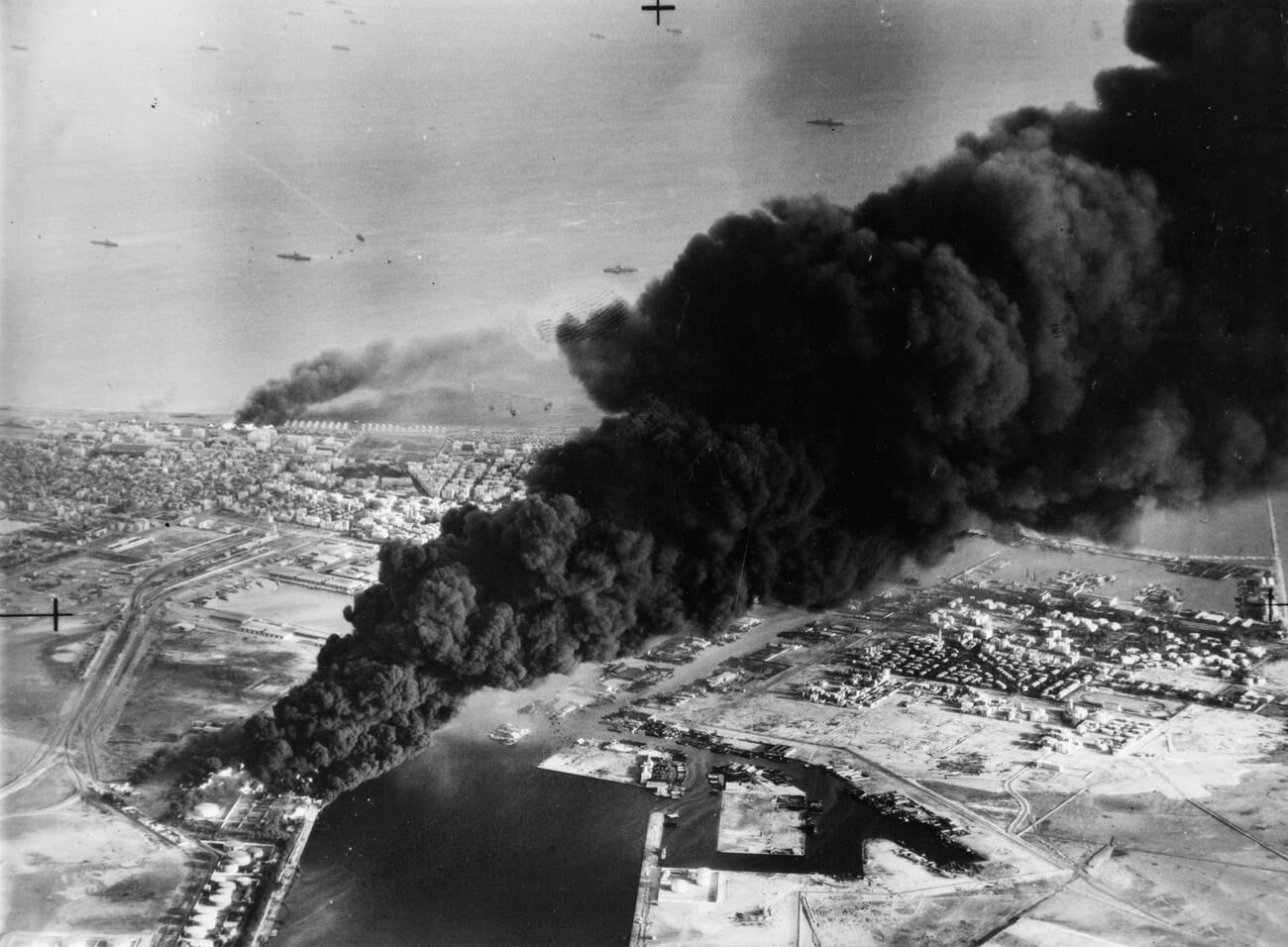
Smoke rises from oil tanks beside the Suez Canal hit during the initial Anglo-French assault on Egypt, 5 November 1956.

These colonies were granted independence after 1945, but France still tried to forge cultural and educational bonds between the areas, particularly with Lebanon. Relationships with Syria are more strained, due to the policies of that country. In 2005, France, along with the United States, pressured Syria to evacuate Lebanon. In the post-World War II era French relations with the Arab Middle East reached a very low point. The war in Algeria between Muslim fighters and French colonists deeply concerned the rest of the Muslim world. The Algerian fighters received much of their supplies and funding from Egypt and other Arab powers, much to France's displeasure.

Most damaging to Franco-Arab relations, however, was the Suez Crisis. It greatly diminished France's reputation in the region. France openly supported the Israeli attack on the Sinai Peninsula, and was working against Nasser, then a popular figure in the Middle East. The Suez Crisis also made France and the United Kingdom look again like imperialist powers attempting to impose their will upon weaker nations. Another hindrance to France's relations with the Arab Middle East was its close alliance with Israel during the 1950s.

=== De Gaulle's policies ===
This all changed with the coming of Charles de Gaulle to power. De Gaulle's foreign policy was centered around an attempt to limit the power and influence of both superpowers, and at the same time increase France's international prestige. De Gaulle hoped to move France from being a follower of the United States to becoming the leading nation of a large group of non-aligned countries. The nations de Gaulle looked at as potential participants in this group were those in France's traditional spheres of influence: Africa and the Middle East. The former French colonies in eastern and northern Africa were quite agreeable to these close relations with France. These nations had close economic and cultural ties to France, and they also had few other suitors amongst the major powers. This new orientation of French foreign policy also appealed strongly to the leaders of the Arab nations. None of them wanted to be dominated by either of the superpowers, and they supported France's policy of trying to balance the US and the USSR and to prevent either from becoming dominant in the region. The Middle Eastern leaders wanted to be free to pursue their own goals and objectives, and did not want to be chained to either alliance bloc. De Gaulle hoped to use this common foundation to build strong relations between the nations. He also hoped that good relations would improve France's trade with the region. De Gaulle also imagined that these allies would look up to the more powerful French nation, and would look to it in leadership in matters of foreign policy.

The end of the Algerian conflict in 1962 accomplished much in this regard. France could not portray itself as a leader of the oppressed nations of the world if it still was enforcing its colonial rule upon another nation. The battle against the Muslim separatists that France waged in favour of the minority of French settlers was an extremely unpopular one throughout the Muslim world. With the conflict raging it would have been close to impossible for France to have had positive relations with the nations of the Middle East. The Middle Eastern support for the FLN guerillas was another strain on relations that the end of the conflict removed. Most of the financial and material support for the FLN had come from the nations of the Middle East and North Africa. This was especially true of Nasser's Egypt, which had long supported the separatists. Egypt is also the most direct example of improved relations after the end of hostilities. The end of the war brought an immediate thaw to Franco-Egyptian relations, Egypt ended the trial of four French officers accused of espionage, and France ended its trade embargo against Egypt.

In 1967 de Gaulle completely overturned France's Israel policy. De Gaulle and his ministers reacted very harshly to Israel's actions in the Six-Day War. The French government and de Gaulle condemned Israel's treatment of refugees, warned that it was a mistake to occupy the West Bank and Gaza Strip, and also refused to recognize the Israeli control of Jerusalem. The French government continued to criticize Israel after the war and de Gaulle spoke out against other Israeli actions, such as the operations against the Palestine Liberation Organization in Lebanon. France began to use its veto power to oppose Israel in the UN, and France sided with the Arab states on almost all issues brought to the international body. Most importantly of all, however, de Gaulle's government imposed an arms embargo on the Israeli state. The embargo was in fact applied to all the combatants, but very soon France began selling weaponry to the Arab states again. As early as 1970 France sold Libya a hundred Dassault Mirage fighter jets. However, after 1967 France continued to support Israel's right to exist, as well as Israel's many preferential agreements with France and the European Economic Community.

=== Foreign aid ===
In the second half of the 20th century, France increased its expenditures in foreign aid greatly, to become second only to the United States in total aid amongst the Western powers and first on a per capita basis. By 1968 France was paying out $855 million per year in aid far more than either West Germany or the United Kingdom. The vast majority of French aid was directed towards Africa and the Middle East, usually either as a lever to promote French interests or to help with the sale of French products (e.g. arms sales). France also increased its expenditures on other forms of aid sending out skilled individuals to developing countries to provide technical and cultural expertise.

The combination of aid money, arms sales, and diplomatic alignments helped to erase the memory of the Suez Crisis and the Algerian War in the Arab world and France successfully developed amicable relationships with the governments of many of the Middle Eastern states. Nasser and de Gaulle, who shared many similarities, cooperated on limiting American power in the region. Nasser proclaimed France as the only friend of Egypt in the West. France and Iraq also developed a close relationship with business ties, joint military training exercises, and French assistance in Iraq's nuclear program in the 1970s. France improved relations with its former colony Syria, and eroded cultural links were partially restored.

In terms of trade France did receive some benefits from the improved relations with the Middle East. French trade with the Middle East increased by over fifty percent after de Gaulle's reforms. The weaponry industries benefited most as France soon had lucrative contracts with many of the regimes in the Middle East and North Africa, though these contracts account for a negligible part of France's economy.

De Gaulle had hoped that by taking a moderate path and not strongly supporting either side France could take part in the Middle East peace process between Israel and the Arab nations. Instead it has been excluded from any major role.

Nicolas de Rivière, the Permanent Representative of France to the United Nations, thanked to Mesdames Bahous, Russell and Kanem for their briefings in Gaza war, and to reiterate France's full support for UN Women, UNICEF and UNFPA in their engagement to help the people of Gaza. Furthermore, France welcomed the agreement, which led to the release of dozens of hostages and a truce.

=== Modern history ===
The Middle East has been a major factor of France's foreign policy. Over a decade since 2000, France successfully built an influential presence across the MENA region where the major focus had been on Saudi Arabia, the United Arab Emirates and Qatar. The Middle East policy of France was essential from the strategic, cultural and economic point of view, where the focus remained on proving itself as an international power. The country invested years in maintaining a strong foothold in the region on the lines of trade, security interests, and cultural and social exchanges. As Emmanuel Macron became the president in 2017, he gave a clear picture about the French relations with the Middle East and its importance, both in his foreign policy speeches and his initiatives. His predecessors, on the other hand, had mostly picked the option of "reassurance" with the region's governments. Gradually, France began to show increasing interest in Saudi Arabia and the United Arab Emirates, particularly. The country became actively supportive towards the two Arab nations in their involvement in the Yemen civil war, becoming one of the crucial arms suppliers. There had been a number of calls from the human rights organizations for France to halt their arms sales to both Saudi and the UAE, which were known for causing a humanitarian crisis in Yemen. Even in 2021, Macron continued taking initiatives towards strengthening relations with the Kingdom and the Emirates. During his visit to the region in November 2021, Macron signed a weapons deal worth 16 billion euros with the UAE. The agreement involved transfer of 80 upgraded Rafale warplanes, along with 12 Airbus-built combat helicopters. While France viewed it as a way to deepen ties with the Emirates, rights organizations criticized and raised concerns around the UAE's involvement in the Yemen and Libyan wars. They objected the deal stating that the Gulf leaders have reflected a constant failure in improving their human rights records.

France and the United Arab Emirates have also developed extensive cultural, academic and scientific cooperation under a cultural, scientific and technical cooperation agreement signed on 3 July 1975. The French Ministry for Europe and Foreign Affairs describes this relationship as part of a “close and innovative partnership” supporting the UAE’s ambition to become a knowledge economy and global cultural hub by 2030. Cultural links include Sorbonne University Abu Dhabi, established following a 2006 agreement, and the International Alliance for the Protection of Heritage in Conflict Areas (ALIPH), created in 2016 with French and Emirati involvement.

The most prominent cultural project is the Louvre Abu Dhabi, inaugurated on Saadiyat Island on 8 November 2017. It was created under an intergovernmental agreement signed on 6 March 2007 and is described by the Musée du Louvre as France’s largest cultural project abroad and the first universal museum in the Arab world. The agreement brought together thirteen French public cultural institutions through Agence France-Muséums, including the Musée du Louvre, Centre Pompidou, Musée d’Orsay, Bibliothèque nationale de France, Musée du quai Branly and Château de Versailles; it provided for French loans, expertise and temporary exhibitions, as well as support for the museum’s scientific and cultural programme. The museum was designed by French architect Jean Nouvel, and the name “Louvre” was licensed to Abu Dhabi for 30 years and six months from the agreement’s signature. Scholars have described the project as a significant example of French cultural diplomacy and a vehicle for presenting France’s universalist cultural ideals abroad.

Despite the improving relations between the Emirates and France, the UAE made extensive efforts to showcase its image in a positive light. In light of it, a Franco-Tunisian businessman, Elyes Ben Chedly reportedly ran promotion for two of the Emirates' cultural campaigns. Reports revealed that the middleman worked to promote the UAE's "Year of Tolerance" campaign, and was also involved in running the "year Zayed" program in Paris. Reports also revealed that Ben Chedly also used his network of arms contracts to mediate weapons deal between the UAE and other nations.

A report in March 2023 by Mediapart revealed that the UAE had been interfering in France by the means of a Switzerland-based intelligence firm Alp Services. A French journalist, Roland Jacquard connected Alp's head Mario Brero with the Emirati secret services client, identified as Mohammed. Jacquard maintained a close contact with a network of politicians and diplomats. He was directly in contact with Mohammed, whose emails revealed that Jacquard was supplying the UAE with information from the security services, Emmanuel Macron and the Élysée.

France and Qatar have maintained diplomatic relations since Qatar declared independence in 1971. The bilateral partnership began to flourish in the early 1990s, focusing on security and hydrocarbon cooperation. TotalEnergies, present in Qatar since 1936, quickly emerged as a key collaborator with QatarEnergies in the extraction and development of the nation's hydrocarbon reserves. Additionally, various agreements have been executed between Qatar and France to bolster security measures for 2024 Summer Olympics in Paris. In preparation for the significant security demands of the event, Poland has pledged to contribute troops, including sniffer dog handlers, to support international efforts aimed at ensuring the safety of the Olympic Games in France.

== Diplomatic relations ==
List of countries which France maintains diplomatic relations with:

| # | Country | Date |
|---|---|---|
| 1 | United Kingdom | 1396 |
| 2 | Portugal | 7 January 1485 |
| 3 | Spain | 1486 |
| 4 | Denmark | 8 July 1498 |
| 5 | Netherlands | 31 July 1584 |
| – | Holy See | 1500s |
| 6 | Switzerland | 29 November 1516 |
| 7 | Sweden | October 1541 |
| 8 | Russia | November 1615 |
| 9 | Iran | 13 August 1715 |
| 10 | United States | 6 August 1778 |
| 11 | Haiti | 17 April 1825 |
| 12 | Brazil | 20 October 1825 |
| 13 | Guatemala | 2 March 1831 |
| 14 | Belgium | 8 March 1831 |
| 15 | Bolivia | 19 June 1831 |
| 16 | Chile | 7 June 1832 |
| 17 | Greece | 19 February 1833 |
| 18 | Venezuela | 11 March 1833 |
| 19 | Argentina | 15 May 1834 |
| 20 | Uruguay | 8 April 1836 |
| 21 | Mexico | 27 February 1840 |
| 22 | Ecuador | 12 February 1848 |
| 23 | Costa Rica | 12 March 1848 |
| 24 | Liberia | 20 April 1852 |
| 25 | Dominican Republic | 8 May 1852 |
| 26 | Paraguay | 4 March 1853 |
| 27 | Honduras | 22 February 1856 |
| 28 | Thailand | 15 August 1856 |
| 29 | Japan | 9 October 1858 |
| 30 | Nicaragua | 11 April 1859 |
| 31 | El Salvador | 21 October 1859 |
| 32 | Peru | 9 March 1861 |
| 33 | Italy | 25 July 1861 |
| 34 | Monaco | 29 April 1873 |
| 35 | Serbia | 18 January 1879 |
| 36 | Bulgaria | 8 July 1879 |
| 37 | Romania | 20 February 1880 |
| 38 | Luxembourg | 10 December 1890 |
| 39 | Colombia | 30 May 1892 |
| 40 | Ethiopia | 20 March 1897 |
| 41 | Cuba | 11 June 1902 |
| 42 | Panama | 18 November 1903 |
| 43 | Norway | 5 November 1905 |
| 44 | Finland | 24 January 1918 |
| 45 | Czech Republic | 17 November 1918 |
| 46 | Poland | 2 April 1919 |
| 47 | Austria | 3 April 1919 |
| 48 | Hungary | 8 January 1920 |
| 49 | Afghanistan | 28 April 1922 |
| 50 | Egypt | 31 May 1922 |
| 51 | Albania | 16 June 1922 |
| 52 | Turkey | 7 October 1924 |
| 53 | Canada | 31 January 1928 |
| 54 | Ireland | 19 October 1929 |
| 55 | South Africa | 5 November 1934 |
| 56 | Saudi Arabia | 1 June 1942 |
| 57 | Yemen | 1 June 1942 |
| 58 | Australia | 4 November 1944 |
| 59 | Lebanon | 25 November 1944 |
| 60 | New Zealand | 13 July 1945 |
| 61 | Iceland | 18 November 1945 |
| 62 | Syria | 18 June 1946 |
| 63 | Iraq | 24 November 1946 |
| 64 | Philippines | 26 June 1947 |
| 65 | India | 15 August 1947 |
| 66 | Pakistan | 2 December 1947 |
| 67 | Jordan | 12 January 1948 |
| 68 | Myanmar | 28 February 1948 |
| 69 | Sri Lanka | 27 October 1948 |
| 70 | South Korea | 15 February 1949 |
| 71 | Nepal | 20 April 1949 |
| 72 | Israel | 11 May 1949 |
| 73 | Indonesia | 4 January 1950 |
| 74 | Laos | 31 January 1951 |
| 75 | Germany | 11 July 1951 |
| 76 | Libya | 1 January 1952 |
| 77 | Cambodia | 4 November 1952 |
| 78 | Morocco | 2 March 1956 |
| 79 | Tunisia | 20 March 1956 |
| 80 | Sudan | 16 April 1956 |
| 81 | Ghana | March 1957 |
| 82 | Malaysia | 31 August 1957 |
| 83 | Guinea | 21 January 1959 |
| 84 | Cameroon | 1 January 1960 |
| 85 | Togo | 27 April 1960 |
| 86 | Madagascar | 25 June 1960 |
| 87 | Democratic Republic of the Congo | 30 June 1960 |
| 88 | Somalia | 1 July 1960 |
| 89 | Benin | 2 August 1960 |
| 90 | Niger | 4 August 1960 |
| — | Burkina Faso (suspended) | 4 August 1960 |
| 91 | Ivory Coast | 8 August 1960 |
| 92 | Chad | 12 August 1960 |
| 93 | Central African Republic | 14 August 1960 |
| 94 | Republic of the Congo | 16 August 1960 |
| 95 | Cyprus | 16 August 1960 |
| 96 | Gabon | 18 August 1960 |
| 97 | Mali | 20 August 1960 |
| 98 | Senegal | 20 August 1960 |
| 99 | Nigeria | 1 October 1960 |
| 100 | Mauritania | 6 December 1960 |
| 101 | Sierra Leone | 27 April 1961 |
| 102 | Tanzania | 22 December 1961 |
| 103 | Burundi | 1 July 1962 |
| 104 | Rwanda | 1 July 1962 |
| 105 | Algeria | 5 July 1962 |
| 106 | Jamaica | 6 August 1962 |
| 107 | Trinidad and Tobago | 31 August 1962 |
| 108 | Uganda | 29 October 1963 |
| 109 | Kenya | 12 December 1963 |
| 110 | China | 27 January 1964 |
| 111 | Kuwait | 17 May 1964 |
| 112 | Malawi | 6 July 1964 |
| 113 | Malta | 21 September 1964 |
| 114 | Zambia | 19 October 1964 |
| 115 | Mongolia | 27 April 1965 |
| 116 | San Marino | 15 May 1965 |
| 117 | Gambia | 28 May 1965 |
| 118 | Singapore | 18 September 1965 |
| 119 | Botswana | 2 February 1967 |
| 120 | Guyana | 22 June 1967 |
| 121 | Lesotho | 21 August 1967 |
| 122 | Mauritius | 12 March 1968 |
| 123 | Barbados | 3 May 1968 |
| 124 | Eswatini | 17 April 1969 |
| 125 | Maldives | 20 May 1969 |
| 126 | Equatorial Guinea | 10 July 1969 |
| 127 | Fiji | 10 October 1970 |
| 128 | Samoa | 16 July 1971 |
| 129 | Tonga | 16 July 1971 |
| 130 | Bahrain | 5 January 1972 |
| 131 | Oman | 5 January 1972 |
| 132 | Qatar | 5 January 1972 |
| 133 | United Arab Emirates | 5 January 1972 |
| 134 | Bangladesh | 17 March 1972 |
| 135 | Vietnam | 12 April 1973 |
| 136 | Grenada | February 1974 |
| 137 | Bahamas | August 1974 |
| 138 | Guinea-Bissau | 15 July 1975 |
| 139 | São Tomé and Príncipe | 28 July 1975 |
| 140 | Cape Verde | 31 December 1975 |
| 141 | Angola | 17 February 1976 |
| 142 | Mozambique | 21 February 1976 |
| 143 | Suriname | 25 August 1976 |
| 143 | Papua New Guinea | 22 June 1976 |
| 145 | Seychelles | 29 June 1976 |
| 146 | Djibouti | 27 June 1977 |
| 147 | Nauru | 15 March 1978 |
| 148 | Comoros | 1 July 1978 |
| 149 | Solomon Islands | 12 October 1978 |
| 150 | Dominica | 17 January 1979 |
| 151 | Tuvalu | 14 May 1979 |
| 152 | Saint Lucia | 14 September 1979 |
| 153 | Zimbabwe | 18 April 1980 |
| 154 | Vanuatu | 30 July 1980 |
| 155 | Belize | November 1981 |
| 156 | Antigua and Barbuda | 6 May 1982 |
| 157 | Saint Vincent and the Grenadines | 5 November 1982 |
| 158 | Kiribati | 3 December 1982 |
| 159 | Brunei | 20 February 1984 |
| 160 | Saint Kitts and Nevis | 17 July 1984 |
| 161 | Namibia | 3 May 1990 |
| 162 | Lithuania | 29 August 1991 |
| 163 | Estonia | 30 August 1991 |
| 164 | Latvia | 30 August 1991 |
| 165 | Ukraine | 24 January 1992 |
| 166 | Belarus | 25 January 1992 |
| 167 | Kazakhstan | 25 January 1992 |
| 168 | Azerbaijan | 21 February 1992 |
| 169 | Armenia | 24 February 1992 |
| 170 | Kyrgyzstan | 28 February 1992 |
| 171 | Uzbekistan | 1 March 1992 |
| 172 | Tajikistan | 3 March 1992 |
| 173 | Turkmenistan | 6 March 1992 |
| 174 | Moldova | 11 March 1992 |
| 175 | Slovenia | 23 April 1992 |
| 176 | Croatia | 24 April 1992 |
| 177 | Georgia | 21 August 1992 |
| 178 | Liechtenstein | 8 October 1992 |
| 179 | Bosnia and Herzegovina | 12 November 1992 |
| 180 | Marshall Islands | 8 December 1992 |
| 181 | Slovakia | 1 January 1993 |
| 182 | Federated States of Micronesia | 21 January 1993 |
| 183 | Andorra | 3 June 1993 |
| 184 | North Macedonia | 27 December 1993 |
| 185 | Eritrea | 23 March 1994 |
| 186 | Palau | 21 October 1997 |
| – | Cook Islands | 19 October 1999 |
| 187 | Timor-Leste | 6 December 2002 |
| 188 | Montenegro | 13 June 2006 |
| – | Kosovo | 18 February 2008 |
| 189 | South Sudan | 11 October 2011 |
| – | Niue | 15 January 2012 |
| – | State of Palestine | 25 March 2026 |

== Bilateral relations ==
=== Africa ===
France plays a significant role in Africa, especially in its former colonies, through extensive aid programs, commercial activities, military agreements, and cultural impact. In those former colonies where the French presence remains important, France contributes to political, military, and social stability. Many think that French policy in Africa – particularly where British interests are also involved – is susceptible to what is known as 'Fashoda syndrome'. Others have criticized the relationship as neocolonialism under the name Françafrique, stressing France's support of various dictatorships, among others: Omar Bongo, Idriss Déby, and Denis Sassou Nguesso. The Defense Agreements between France and French-speaking African countries established close cooperation, particularly in defense and security matters. Often accompanied by secret clauses, they allowed France to intervene militarily: to rescue regimes in order to establish the legitimacy of political powers favorable to its interests, to fight jihadism, particularly in the Sahel, or to put an end to civil wars. The departure of French troops from the African continent signals the end of a world, that of interventions in Chad, Togo, Gabon, Rwanda, Djibouti, Zaire, Somalia, Ivory Coast, Mali, Libya, and Cameroon. It also marks the end of Françafrique.

| Country | Formal relations began | Notes |
|---|---|---|
| Algeria | 1962 | See Algeria–France relations Relations between post-colonial Algeria and France have remained close throughout the years, although sometimes difficult. In 1962, the Évian Accords peace treaty laid the foundations of a new Franco-Algerian relationship. In exchange for a generous coopération regime (massive financial, technical and cultural aid), France secured a number of economic and military privileges. Economically, France enjoyed a preferential treatment vis-à-vis the Saharan wealth of hydrocarbons. Militarily, it could keep the Mers-el-Kébir base for 15 years and use the Saharan nuclear test-sites for another five years. France had used these sites to carry out its first nuclear tests (Gerboise bleue) in 1960. 90% or more of the Europeans established in Algeria (pieds-noirs) left the country in a massive exodus creating a difficult void in the bureaucratic, economic and educational structure of Algeria. On the other hand, the issue of the harkis, the Arabs who had fought on the French side during the war, was still to be resolved at the turn of the 21st century, being somehow ignored by the French while seen as outright traitors by the Algerian people. On the economical level, Algeria remained for some time the fourth largest importer of French goods, conducting all its transactions with France in the Franc zone. Many Algerians were encouraged by French authorities and businessmen to migrate to France in order to provide workforce during the Trente Glorieuses (Thirty Glorious) growth. Relations between France and Algeria have remained closely intertwined, and France could not entirely escape from the chaos which threatened Algeria during the civil war in the nineties. Ahmed Ben Bella, the first President of Algeria was reported in a 2001 interview as saying that "The Algerian people have lived with blood. We brought de Gaulle to his knees. We struggled against French rule for 15 years under the leadership of Emir Abdel-Kader Al-Jazairi. The Algerian population was then four million. French repression cost us two million lives. It was genocide. We survived as a people. Barbaric French atrocities did not subdue our fighting spirit." On 23 February 2005, the French law on colonialism was an act passed by the Union for a Popular Movement (UMP) conservative majority, which imposed on high-school (lycée) teachers to teach the "positive values" of colonialism to their students (article 4). The law created a public uproar and opposition from the whole of the left-wing, and was finally repealed by president Jacques Chirac (UMP) at the beginning of 2006, after accusations of historical revisionism from various teachers and historians. Algerians feared that the French law on colonialism would hinder the task the French confronting the dark side of their colonial rule in Algeria because article 4 of the law decreed among other things that "School programmes are to recognise in particular the positive role of the French presence overseas, especially in North Africa, ..." Benjamin Stora a leading specialist on French Algerian history and an opponent of the French law on colonialism, said "France has never taken on its colonial history. It is a big difference with the Anglo-Saxon countries, where post-colonial studies are now in all the universities. We are phenomenally behind the times." In his opinion, although the historical facts were known to academics, they were not well known by the French public and this led to a lack of honesty in France over French colonial treatment of the Algerian people. During the period that the French law on colonialism was in force, several Algerians and others raised issues and made comments to emphasise that there were many aspects of French colonial rule that were not widely known in France. A senior Algerian official Mohamed El Korso said that "[French] repentance is seen by the Algerian people as a sine qua non before any Franco-Algerian friendship treaty can be concluded." and with reference to the Setif massacre that "French and international public opinion must know that France committed a real act of genocide in May 1945" The Algerian president Abdelaziz Bouteflika said Algeria had "never ceased waiting for an admission from France of all the acts committed during the colonial period and the war of liberation." and drew comparisons between the burning of the bodies of the victims of the Setif massacre with the crematoria in the Nazi death camps. More recently on 17 April 2006, Bouteflika emphasised Algeria's point of view when said in a speech in Paris that "Colonization brought the genocide of our identity, of our history, of our language, of our traditions". French authorities responded to the claims by President Bouteflika and others by playing down the comments, urging "mutual respect" French Foreign Minister Michel Barnier told Algeria in an official visit to make a common effort to search history "in order to establish a common future and overcome the sad pages". In an interview with El Vatan, an Algerian newspaper, Barnier said that "Historians from two sides must be encouraged to work together. They must work on the common past". French authorities asked president Abdelaziz Bouteflika to study with France the disarmed 150,000 Harkis killed without another reason that revenge, by his party, the National Liberation Front (FLN). French President Jacques Chirac, upon harsh reactions to the law encouraging the good sides of the French colonial history, made the statement, "Writing history is the job of the historians, not of the laws." According to Prime Minister, Dominique de Villepin, "speaking about the past or writing history is not the job of the parliament." The issue of the French human rights record in Algeria is also politically sensitive in Turkey. France recognized Armenian genocide by the Turks in 1998. In response to the action of the French parliament, making it an offense to deny the existence of such a genocide, the Grand National Assembly of Turkey drafted a bill in October 2006 to make it illegal to deny that the French committed genocide in Algeria. Turkish party leaders, including CHP, MHP, BBP and ANAP called on France to recognize what they called "Algerian genocide". However, the draft never became an official law.: Algeria has an embassy in Paris and several consulates-general throughout the country.; France has an embassy in Algiers and consulates-general in Annaba and Oran. |
| Angola | | See Angola–France relations Relations between the two countries have not always been cordial due to the former French government's policy of supporting militant separatists in Angola's Cabinda Province and the international Angolagate scandal embarrassed both governments by exposing corruption and illicit arms deals. Following French President Nicolas Sarkozy's visit in 2008, relations have improved.: Angola has an embassy in Paris.; France has an embassy in Luanda. |
| Burkina Faso | 4 August 1960 (Relations severed June 2026) | See Burkina Faso–France relations Present day Burkina Faso was formerly part of a French colony called French Upper Volta. France has special forces stationed in Burkina Faso.: Burkina Faso has an embassy in Paris.; France has an embassy in Ouagadougou.; In January 2023, Burkina Faso's military junta asked France to recall its ambassador amid a surge of anti-French sentiment as the country moved to develop closer ties to Russia |
| Cape Verde | | See Cape Verde–France relations: Cape Verde has an embassy in Paris and consulate-general in Nice.; France has an embassy in Praia. |
| Central African Republic | 13 August 1960 | See Central African Republic–France relations: Central African Republic has an embassy in Paris.; France has an embassy in Bangui. |
| Chad | 11 August 1960 | See Chad–France relations The French military has been present in Chad since 1986 in the frame of Operation Epervier.: Chad has an embassy in Paris.; France has an embassy in N'djamena. |
| Congo | | See Republic of the Congo–France relations: Congo has an embassy in Paris.; France has an embassy in Brazzaville. |
| Democratic Republic of the Congo | | In 2013, France's then president on his visit to DRC suggested that prisoners Joshua French and Tjostolv Moland should be moved out of the situation of their six-man prison cell; five days later the two prisoners shared a cell of their own.: DR Congo has an embassy in Paris.; France has an embassy in Kinshasa. |
| Djibouti | | See Djibouti–France relations: Djibouti has an embassy in Paris; France has an embassy in Djibouti City. |
| Egypt | | See Egypt–France relations: Egypt has an embassy in Paris.; France has an embassy in Cairo and a consulate-general in Alexandria. |
| Gabon | | See France–Gabon relations Since independence, Gabon has been "one of France's closest allies in Africa". As of 2008, around 10,000 French nationals lived and worked in Gabon, while the 6th Marine Infantry Battalion of the French military is also stationed there.: France has an embassy in Libreville.; Gabon has an embassy in Paris. |
| Ivory Coast | | See France–Ivory Coast relations In 2002 and 2003, France participated in military interventions in Côte d'Ivoire in Opération Licorne and UNOCI. Liberia and the Democratic Republic of Congo helped in the evacuation of foreign residents and the protection of civilians from warring factions.: Côte d'Ivoire has an embassy in Paris and a consulate-general in Lyon.; France has an embassy in Abidjan. |
| Kenya | | See France–Kenya relations: France has an embassy in Nairobi.; Kenya has an embassy in Paris. |
| Lesotho | | See France–Lesotho relations: France has an embassy in Maseru.; Lesotho does not have an embassy in France. |
| Liberia | 1852 | See France–Liberia relations: France has an embassy in Monrovia.; Liberia has an embassy in Paris. |
| Libya | | See France–Libya relations In the 1980s, Libyan-French discord centered on the situation in Chad. As mentioned, the two countries found themselves supporting opposite sides in the Chadian Civil War. In late 1987, there were some French troops in Chad, but French policy did not permit its forces to cross the sixteenth parallel. Thus, direct clashes with Libyan soldiers seemed unlikely. On 10 March 2011, France was the first country in the world to recognise the National Transitional Council as the legitimate government of Libya, in the context of the 2011 Libyan civil war against Muammar Gaddafi. |
| Madagascar | 26 June 1960 | See France–Madagascar relations: France has an embassy in Antananarivo.; Madagascar has an embassy in Paris and consulates-general in Marseille and Saint-Denis. |
| Mali | | See France–Mali relations: France has an embassy in Bamako.; Mali has an embassy in Paris. |
| Mauritania | | See France–Mauritania relations The relations date back to the colonial era when Mauritania was part of French West Africa.: France has an embassy in Nouakchott.; Mauritania has an embassy in Paris. |
| Mauritius | | See France–Mauritius relations: France has an embassy in Port Louis.; Mauritius has an embassy in Paris. |
| Morocco | | See France–Morocco relations: France has an embassy in Rabat and several consulates-general throughout the country.; Morocco has an embassy in Paris and several consulates-general throughout the country. |
| Mozambique | | See France–Mozambique relations: France has an embassy in Maputo.; Mozambique has an embassy in Paris. |
| Niger | 4 August 1960 (relations severed 4 August 2023 | See France–Niger relations. The relations between France and the Republic of Niger are based on a long shared history and the more than sixty year rule of Niger by French colonial empire beginning with the French conquest in 1898. Niger obtained independence from France in 1960, and a history of French influenced culture and French language have been a point of commonality in the creation of a distinctive Nigerien culture from the diverse pre-colonial nationalities which make up modern Niger. France benefited economically from their time as a colonial power, and still relies on imports from Niger for elements of their economy.: France has an embassy in Niamey.; Niger has an embassy in Paris. |
| Rwanda | | See France–Rwanda relations In the period from 1990, until the Rwandan genocide, France (under Mitterrand) took a role sympathetic to the Habyarimana government.: France has an embassy in Kigali.; Rwanda has an embassy in Paris. |
| Senegal | August 1960 | See France–Senegal relations: France has an embassy in Dakar.; Senegal has an embassy in Paris and consulates-general in Bordeaux, Lyon and in Marseille and a consular agency in Le Havre. |
| Somalia | | See France–Somalia relations Bilateral relations between France and Somalia were established shortly after Somalia's independence. The French government opened an embassy in Mogadishu, and its Somalian counterpart likewise maintained an embassy in Paris. Following a significantly improved security situation, the Government of France in January 2014 appointed Remi Marechaux as the new French ambassador to Somalia. |
| Sudan | | France has had a long history as one of Sudan's principal commercial partners. A French company was one of the prime contractors on the ill-fated Jonglei Canal. In the early 1980s, Sudan awarded a concession to the French oil company, TotalFinaElf, for development of the oil reserves in Block Five in South Sudan. Although the company stopped work there following the resumption of civil war, it retained the concession and initiated steps in 2004 to return. France also sided with the government of Sudan in 2004 when it asserted that the situation in Darfur should not be described as genocide. Chad, a former French colony and in recent years a country with which it had close relations, tended to influence France's view of the situation in Darfur. French policy on Darfur became more critical following the election in 2007 of President Nicolas Sarkozy. France hosted in June 2007 the United States, China, and some 15 other countries at a major conference intended to launch a new international effort to end the atrocities in Darfur. The government of Sudan, angry that it was not consulted, boycotted the conference. In recent years, France has shown less interest in Sudan while its policy seemed to depend on which official was speaking. French oil companies have a continuing interest in the development of oil in South Sudan.: France has an embassy in Khartoum.; Sudan has an embassy in Paris. |
| South Africa | | See France–South Africa relations: France has an embassy in Pretoria and consulates-general in Cape Town and Johannesburg.; South Africa has an embassy in Paris. |
| Togo | | See France–Togo relations: France has an embassy in Lomé.; Togo has an embassy in Paris. |
| Tunisia | | See France–Tunisia relations: France has an embassy in Tunis.; Tunisia has an embassy in Paris and several consulates-general throughout the country. |

=== Americas ===
| Country | Formal relations began | Notes |
|---|---|---|
| Argentina | 1829 | See Argentina–France relations: Argentina has an embassy in Paris.; France has an embassy in Buenos Aires.; List of Treaties ruling the relations Argentina and France (Argentine Foreign Ministry, in Spanish); French Ministry of Foreign Affairs about the relations with Argentina |
| Barbados | 3 May 1968 | See Barbados–France relations: Barbados is accredited to France from its embassy in Brussels, Belgium.; France is accredited to Barbados from its embassy in Castries, Saint Lucia and maintains an honorary consulate in Bridgetown. |
| Brazil | | See Brazil–France relations France has recognized Brazil as its special partner in South America and as a global player in international affairs. The two countries are committed to strengthening their bilateral cooperation in the areas for which working groups have been created: nuclear energy, renewable energies, defence technologies, technological innovation, joint cooperation in African countries and space technologies, medicines and the environment. Recently, France announced its support to the Brazilian bid for a permanent seat on the United Nations Security Council.: Brazil has an embassy in Paris and consulates-general in Marseille and in Cayenne and Saint-Georges, French Guiana.; France has an embassy in Brasília and consulates-general in Rio de Janeiro and São Paulo and a consulate in Recife. |
| Canada | | See Canada–France relations: Canada has an embassy in Paris. Quebec also maintains a paradiplomatic Government Office called Délégation générale du Québec à Paris.; France has an embassy in Ottawa and consulates-general in Moncton, Montreal, Quebec City, Toronto and Vancouver. |
| Chile | 1846 | See Chile–France relations: Chile has an embassy in Paris.; France has an embassy in Santiago. |
| Colombia | 1830 | See Colombia–France relations Relations with Colombia have been dimmed, by the Ingrid Betancourt issue from 2002 to 2008; in 2002, Ingrid Betancourt, a Colombian and French citizen and the green party candidate to the presidency of Colombia, was kidnapped by the Revolutionary Armed Forces of Colombia (FARC), France pushed the Colombian government to free FARC prisoners to get Mrs Betancourt back; Colombia once consented with these efforts and on 4 June 2007; 30 FARC members were liberated, including the leader Rodrigo Granda. On 2 July 2008 Ingrid Betancourt was rescued by the Colombian authorities in Operation Jaque. France had urged Colombia not to attempt to free Betancourt.: Colombia has an embassy in Paris.; France has an embassy in Bogotá. |
| Cuba | | See Cuba–France relations: Cuba has an embassy in Paris.; France has an embassy in Havana. |
| Commonwealth of Dominica | 17 January 1979 | See Commonwealth of Dominica–France relations: The Commonwealth of Dominica has an embassy in London.; France has a regional embassy in Castries, Saint Lucia. |
| El Salvador | 2 January 1858 | See El Salvador–France relations: El Salvador has an embassy in Paris.; France has an embassy in San Salvador. |
| Guyana | 22 June 1967 | Both countries established diplomatic relations on 22 June 1967.; France is accredited to Guyana from its embassy in Paramaribo, Suriname and maintains an honorary consulate in Georgetown, Guyana.; Guyana is accredited to France from its high commission in London, United Kingdom.; Both countries have passed a number of bilateral treaties. |
| Haiti | 1825 | See France–Haiti relations: France has an embassy in Port-au-Prince.; Haiti has an embassy in Paris and consulates-general in Cayenne, French Guiana and in Pointe-à-Pitre, Guadeloupe. |
| Mexico | 26 November 1826 | See France–Mexico relations: France has an embassy in Mexico City and a consulate-general in Monterrey.; Mexico has an embassy in Paris and a liaison office in Strasbourg.; Both countries are members of the OECD and the G-20.; French Ministry of Foreign Affairs on relations with Mexico; Mexican Ministry of Foreign Affairs on historical bilateral relations with France |
| Paraguay | 1853 | Both countries has diplomatic relations since the Treaty of Friendship, Trade and Navigation signed in 1853.; France has an embassy in Asunción.; Paraguay has an embassy in Paris.; French Ministry of Foreign Relations about relations with Paraguay; Paraguayan Ministry of Foreign Relations about relations with France |
| Peru | 1826 | See France–Peru relations: France has an embassy in Lima.; Peru has an embassy in Paris. |
| Suriname | 25 August 1976 | See France–Suriname relations: France has an embassy in Paramaribo.; Suriname has an embassy in Paris, a consulate-general in Cayenne and a consulate in Saint-Laurent-du-Maroni, French Guiana. |
| Trinidad and Tobago | | See France–Trinidad and Tobago relations Bilateral relations between the countries France and Trinidad and Tobago have existed for about two hundred years. Currently, France has an embassy in Port of Spain. Trinidad and Tobago is represented in France through its embassy in Brussels (Belgium). Trinidad and Tobago also has bilateral investment agreements with France.: France has an embassy in Port of Spain.; Trinidad and Tobago is accredited to France from its embassy in Brussels, Belgium. |
| United States | | See France–United States relations Relations between the United States and France are active and cordial. Mutual visits by high-level officials are conducted on a regular basis and bilateral contact at the cabinet level is active. France and the United States cooperate closely on some issues (such as anti-terrorism) but differ on others (such as the Israeli–Palestinian conflict and a number of trade issues). Differences are discussed frankly. The largest current fallout between the United States and France involves the Iraq War, and some aspects of the post-11 September war on terror, e.g., CIA "extraordinary renditions".: France has an embassy in Washington, D.C. and consulates-general in Atlanta, Boston, Chicago, Houston, Los Angeles, Miami, New Orleans, New York City and San Francisco.; United States has an embassy in Paris and consulates-general in Marseille and Strasbourg. |
| Uruguay | 1825 | See France–Uruguay relations: France has an embassy in Montevideo.; Uruguay has an embassy in Paris and honorary consulates in Bordeaux, Marseille and Toulouse.; French Ministry of Foreign Affairs about relations with Uruguay |
| Venezuela | | See France–Venezuela relations: France has an embassy in Caracas; Venezuela has an embassy in Paris. |

=== Asia ===
France has extensive political and economical relations with Asian countries, including China, India, Japan, South Korea and Southeast Asia as well as an increasing presence in regional fora. France was instrumental in launching the Asia–Europe Meeting (ASEM) process which could eventually emerge as a competitor to APEC. France is seeking to broaden its commercial presence in China and will pose a competitive challenge to U.S. business, particularly in aerospace, high-tech, and luxury markets. In Southeast Asia, France was an architect of the Paris Peace Accords.

France does not have formal diplomatic relationships with North Korea. North Korea however maintains a delegation (not an embassy nor a consulate) near Paris. As most countries, France does not recognize, nor have formal diplomatic relationships with Taiwan, due to its recognition of China; however, Taiwan maintains a representation office in Paris which is similar to an embassy. Likewise, the French Institute in Taipei has an administrative consular section that delivers visas and fulfills other missions normally dealt with by diplomatic outposts.

| Country | Formal relations began | Notes |
|---|---|---|
| Afghanistan | 1922 | See Afghanistan–France relations: Afghanistan has an embassy in Paris.; France has an embassy in Kabul, but its activities have been suspended since 2 September 2021. |
| Armenia | | See Armenia–France relations: Armenia has an embassy in Paris and consulates-general in Lyon and Marseille.; France has an embassy in Yerevan.; France recognized the Armenian genocide in 1998.; Both countries are full members of the Council of Europe.; France supports Armenia's EU membership. |
| Azerbaijan | 21 February 1992 | See Azerbaijan-France relations: Azerbaijan has an embassy in Paris.; France has an embassy in Baku.; Both countries are full members of the Council of Europe. |
| Bangladesh | | See Bangladesh–France relations: Bangladesh has an embassy in Paris.; France has an embassy in Dhaka. |
| Cambodia | | See Cambodia–France relations: Cambodia has an embassy in Paris.; France has an embassy in Phnom Penh. |
| China | 7 October 1913 | See China–France relations During the 1990s, France and the PRC repeatedly clashed as a result of the PRC's One China Policy. France sold weapons to Taiwan, angering the Beijing government. This resulted in the temporary closure of the French Consulate-General in Guangzhou. France eventually agreed to prohibit local companies from selling arms to Taiwan, and diplomatic relations resumed in 1994. Since then, the two countries have exchanged a number of state visits. Today, Sino-French relations are primarily economic. Bilateral trade reached new high levels in 2000. Cultural ties between the two countries are less well represented, though France is making an effort to improve this disparity.: China has an embassy in Paris and consulates-general in Lyon, Marseille, Papeete, Saint-Denis and Strasbourg.; France has an embassy in Beijing and consulates-general in Chengdu, Guangzhou, Hong Kong, Shanghai, Shenyang and Wuhan.; The bilateral investment relationship between France and China has been a key component of their economic partnership, with more than 50 agreements signed in sectors like nuclear energy, aerospace, and finance during Xi Jinping's 2015 visit to France. Emmanuel Macron's 2018 trip to Beijing further reinforced this partnership with €13 billion in contracts. Recent initiatives include collaboration in green energy and technology, significant investments in the automotive industry, infrastructure cooperation, aerospace industry developments, energy sector investments, and luxury goods market collaborations. In April 2024, French Foreign Minister Stephane Sejourne emphasized that France didn't plan to "decouple" from China but instead aimed for an "economic rebalancing" to establish a durable and fair trade partnership. He confirmed that ongoing discussions on "de-risking" with China would be maintained by France and the European Union, with no allusion to potential protectionist measures from the EU. |
| Georgia | 21 August 1992 | See France–Georgia relations: France has an embassy in Tbilisi.; Georgia has an embassy in Paris.; Both countries are full members of the Council of Europe.; France is an EU member and Georgia is an EU candidate. |
| India | | See France–India relations The Indian Air Force has the second largest fleet of France's Mirage 2000H after Armée de l'Air. France and India established diplomatic relationships soon after India achieved independence in 1947. India's strong diplomatic ties with France resulted in the peaceful cession of Pondichéry to India on 1 November 1954 without any military opposition from France. France was the only country that did not condemn India's decision to go nuclear in 1998. In 2003, France became the largest supplier of nuclear fuel and technology to India and remains a large military and economic trade partner. India's permanent member aspirations in the UN Security Council have found very strong support from former French President Chirac. The decision by the Indian government to purchase French Scorpène-class submarines worth US$3 billion and 43 Airbus aircraft for Indian Airlines worth US$2.5 billion has further cemented the strategic, military and economic co-operation between India and France. France also became the first country to do nuclear trade with India after NSG waiver on 30 September 2008.: France has an embassy in New Delhi and consulates-generals in Bengaluru, Pondicherry, Mumbai and kolkata.; India has an embassy in Paris and consulates-general in Reunion island. |
| Indonesia | | See France–Indonesia relations The relations between France and Indonesia have been increasing of late, while Indonesia has become increasingly strategic to the government and people of France. Not only because of economic development (there are 110 French multinational companies operated in Indonesia), it also because France viewed Indonesia has been playing an increasingly significant international role. The relations between two nations are important as both are democratic republics and both holds significant geopolitical influences in each regions, France is indispensable member of European Union, as well as Indonesia for Association of Southeast Asian Nations. The diplomatic relation between France and Indonesia is also a key element for developing relations between Indonesia and the European Union and between France and the ASEAN. Both nations are the member of G-20 major economies.: France has an embassy in Jakarta.; Indonesia has an embassy in Paris. |
| Iran | | See France–Iran relations Iran has generally enjoyed a friendly relationship with France since the Middle Ages. The travels of Jean-Baptiste Tavernier are particularly well known to Safavid Persia. Relations between France and Iran also remained friendly under French President Jacques Chirac. Recently however, relations have soured over Iran's refusal to halt uranium enrichment and France supporting the referral of Iran to the United Nations Security Council.: France has an embassy in Tehran.; Iran has an embassy in Paris. |
| Iraq | | See France–Iraq relations Before Iraq invaded Kuwait in 1991, France enjoyed friendly relations with former Iraqi president Saddam Hussein, however the relationship turned sour once Iraq entered Kuwaiti soil and soon France cut off ties with Iraq. Following thirteen years, France resumed relations with Iraq in 2003. France and Germany opposed the American-British invasion of 2003 to 2011.: France has an embassy in Baghdad.; Iraq has an embassy in Paris. |
| Israel | 12 January 1949 | See France–Israel relations: France has an embassy in Tel Aviv and consulates-general in Haifa and Jerusalem.; Israel has an embassy in Paris and a consulate-general in Marseille. |
| Japan | | See France–Japan relations Recently France has been very involved in trade and cultural exchange initiatives with Japan. Some people see this as being a result of French leader Jacques Chirac being a Japanophile. Chirac has visited Japan over 40 times, probably more than any other world leader outside Japan, and is an expert on the country. France has started the export promotion campaign "Le Japon, c'est possible" and the international liaison personnel exchange JET Programme. Together they built the Japanese cultural House in Paris (French: Maison de la culture du Japon à Paris). France and Japan have also worked together to improve dire health situations from AIDS and underdevelopment in Djibouti, Madagascar, Uganda, and other countries. Japan and France are also known to share ideas with each other in the realms of art and cooking. Japan has been heavily influenced by French cuisine within the past few decades, as seen on the television show Iron Chef. Anime is popular in France, and French historical figures and settings from medieval, Renaissance, Napoleonic, and World War eras have served as models for certain popular stories in Japanese entertainment. The purity of Japanese painting and illustration, and likewise the modernity and elegance of French visual arts has resulted in hybrid styles in those creative fields.: France has an embassy in Tokyo and consulate-general in Kyoto.; Japan has an embassy in Paris. |
| Kazakhstan | 25 January 1992 | See France–Kazakhstan relations: France has an embassy in Astana and a consulate-general in Almaty.; Kazakhstan has an embassy in Paris.; Over 140 enterprises with French capital operate in Kazakhstan, including Total, Areva, Danone, Vicat, Peugeot, Alstom, etc. |
| Kuwait | | See France–Kuwait relations: France has an embassy in Kuwait City.; Kuwait has an embassy in Paris. |
| Laos | | See France–Laos relations: France has an embassy in Vientiane.; Laos has an embassy in Paris. |
| Lebanon | | See France–Lebanon relations: France has an embassy in Beirut.; Lebanon has an embassy in Paris and a consulate-general in Marseille. |
| Malaysia | 1957 | See France–Malaysia relations: France has an embassy in Kuala Lumpur.; Malaysia has an embassy in Paris.; The relations started after the Federation of Malaya achieved independence in 1957, although the first Malayan ambassador to France only arrived in Paris in 1959. During the administration of Jacques Chirac and Mahathir Mohamad, the relations significantly improved especially in economics, politics and culturally aspects. |
| Myanmar | | See France–Myanmar relations Following the end of World War II, ambassador-level diplomatic relationships between France and Burma were established in 1948, soon after the Burmese nation became an independent republic on 4 January 1948, as Union of Burma, with Sao Shwe Thaik as its first President and U Nu as its first Prime Minister.: France has an embassy in Yangon.; Myanmar has an embassy in Paris. |
| North Korea | —N/a | See France–North Korea relations Relations between the France and North Korea are officially non-existent. France is one of the two European Union members not to recognise North Korea, the other being Estonia. France therefore officially recognises South Korean sovereignty over the Korean Peninsula. There is no French embassy, nor any other type of French diplomatic representation, in Pyongyang, and no DPRK embassy in Paris. There is, however, a North Korean diplomatic office in Neuilly sur Seine, near Paris. |
| Pakistan | | See France–Pakistan relations Pakistan and France have high levels of diplomatic meetings and enjoy very friendly bilateral relations. However, these good relations haven't been around very long due to a variety of reasons. Trade between the two countries is generally increasing with time. See also Pakistanis in France, Musa Javed Chohan: former ambassador of Pakistan to France and recipient of the Ordre National du Merite for the promotion of bilateral cooperation between France and Pakistan.: France has an embassy in Islamabad.; Pakistan has an embassy in Paris. |
| Philippines | 1947 | See France–Philippines relations The France–Philippines relations refers to the foreign relations between France and the Philippines. In 1947, France and the Philippines signed a Treaty of Amity which established diplomatic relations with the two countries.: France has an embassy in Manila.; Philippines has an embassy in Paris. |
| Qatar | | See France–Qatar relations Qatar is dependent on France for around 80% of its military imports. The first bilateral agreement between the two countries was signed in 1974. A defense pact was signed in 1994. Qatar's sovereign wealth fund has stakes in numerous French companies, including Paris Saint-Germain, Vivendi, and Vinci SA.: France has an embassy in Doha.; Qatar has an embassy in Paris. |
| Saudi Arabia | | See France–Saudi Arabia relations: France has an embassy in Riyadh and a consulate-general in Jeddah..; Saudi Arabia has an embassy in Paris. |
| Singapore | | See France–Singapore relations: France has an embassy in Singapore.; Singapore has an embassy Paris. |
| South Korea | 4 June 1886 | See France–South Korea relations The establishment of diplomatic relations between France and South Korea began on 4 June 1886. France and South Korea maintain very good relations. They collaborate on many topics and issues that are facing the world today. This was seen especially on the question of the Democratic People's Republic of Korea (DPRK) which is of course a matter of great importance for both countries Besides bilateral cooperation France and South Korea also work together in international organizations such as the United Nations, UNESCO, the OECD, etc. On the matter of North Korea, France is one of the few European countries (EU/EEA) to not have official diplomatic relations with North Korea. France has supported the Six-party talks as well as the role of the IAEA in finding solutions to the nuclear issue. The French Government had made an agreement of the Working Holiday Visa program with South Korea.: France has an embassy in Seoul.; South Korea has an embassy in Paris. |
| Syria | 18 June 1946 | See France–Syria relations France recognized the SNC on 21 November 2011. |
| Thailand | | See France–Thailand relations France–Thailand relations cover a period from the 16th century until modern times. Relations started in earnest during the reign of Louis XIV with numerous reciprocal embassies, and a major attempt by France to Christianize Siam (modern Thailand) and establish a French protectorate, which failed when the country revolted against foreign intrusions in 1688. France would only return more than a century and a half later as a modernized colonial power, engaging in a struggle for territory and influence against Thailand in the Indochinese Peninsula, which would last until the 20th century.: France has an embassy in Bangkok.; Thailand has an embassy in Paris. |
| Turkey | | See France–Turkey relations: France has an embassy in Ankara and a consulate-general in Istanbul.; Turkey has an embassy in Paris.; Both countries are full members of NATO.; France is an EU member and Turkey is an EU candidate. France opposes Turkey's accession negotiations to the EU, although negotiations have now been suspended. |
| Turkmenistan | | See France–Turkmenistan relations: France has an embassy in Ashgabat.; Turkmenistan has an embassy in Paris. |
| United Arab Emirates | | See France–United Arab Emirates relations: France has an embassy in Abu Dhabi and a consulate-general in Dubai.; United Arab Emirates has an embassy in Paris. |
| Vietnam | | See France–Vietnam relations France–Vietnam relations started as early as the 17th century with the mission of the Jesuit father Alexandre de Rhodes. Various traders would visit Vietnam during the 18th century, until the major involvement of French forces under Pigneau de Béhaine to help establish the Nguyễn dynasty from 1787 to 1789. France was heavily involved in Vietnam in the 19th century under the pretext of protecting the work of Catholic missionaries in the country. France progressively carved for itself a huge colony, which would form French Indochina in 1887. France continued to rule Vietnam as a colony until France's defeat in the First Indochina War and the proclamation of Vietnam's independence in 1954.: France has an embassy in Hanoi and a consulate-general in Ho Chi Minh City.; Vietnam has an embassy in Paris. |

=== Europe ===
France has maintained its status as key power in Western Europe because of its size, location, strong economy, membership in European organizations, strong military posture and energetic diplomacy. France generally has worked to strengthen the global economic and political influence of the EU and its role in common European defense and collective security.

France supports the development of a European Security and Defence Identity (ESDI) as the foundation of efforts to enhance security in the European Union. France cooperates closely with Germany and Spain in this endeavor.

| Country | Formal relations began | Notes |
|---|---|---|
| Albania | | See Albania–France relations Autonomous Albanian Republic of Korçë: Albania has an embassy in Paris.; France has an embassy in Tirana. |
| Andorra | | See Andorra–France relations: Andorra has an embassy in Paris.; France has an embassy in Andorra la Vella. |
| Austria | | See Austria–France relations: Austria has an embassy in Paris.; France has an embassy in Vienna.; Both countries are full members of the European Union and of the Council of Europe. |
| Belgium | | See Belgium–France relations: Belgium has an embassy in Paris and consulates-general in Marseille and Strasbourg.; France has an embassy in Brussels.; Both countries are full members of the European Union and NATO. |
| Bosnia and Herzegovina | | See Bosnia and Herzegovina-France relations France was the first country to open embassy in besieged Sarajevo in January 1993. Centre André Malraux and French primary school are located in Sarajevo and French Institute and French Cultural Centre offices are present in Banja Luka, Mostar and Tuzla. Since October 2010 Bosnia and Herzegovina is an observer on the Francophonie.: Bosnia and Herzegovina has an embassy in Paris; France has an embassy in Sarajevo. |
| Bulgaria | 8 July 1879 | See Bulgaria–France relations: Bulgaria has an embassy in Paris.; France has an embassy in Sofia.; Both nations are members of the European Union, NATO and of the Council of Europe.; Bulgaria is a full member of the Francophonie since 1993.; French president Nicolas Sarkozy, has been essential for the liberation of the Bulgarian nurse in the HIV trial in Libya.: French Foreign Ministry about relations with Bulgaria |
| Croatia | | See Croatia–France relations: Croatia has an embassy in Paris.; France has an embassy in Zagreb.; Both nations are members of the European Union, NATO and of the Council of Europe.; Croatia was an autonomous state of the first French Republic |
| Cyprus | | See Cyprus–France relations: Cyprus has an embassy in Paris.; France has an embassy in Nicosia.; Both countries are full members of the European Union and of the Council of Europe. |
| Czech Republic | | See Czech Republic–France relations: Czech Republic has an embassy in Paris.; France has an embassy in Prague.; Both countries are full members of the European Union and NATO. |
| Denmark | | See Denmark–France relations: Denmark has an embassy in Paris.; France has an embassy in Copenhagen.; Both countries are full members of the European Union and NATO. |
| Estonia | | See Estonia–France relations: Estonia has an embassy in Paris.; France has an embassy in Tallinn.; Both countries are full members of the European Union and NATO. |
| Finland | | See Finland–France relations: Finland has an embassy in Paris.; France has an embassy in Helsinki.; Both nations are members of the European Union, NATO and of the Council of Europe.; France fully supported Finland's application to join NATO, which resulted in membership on 4 April 2023. |
| Germany | | See France–Germany relations Franco-German cooperation is widely seen as the engine of European integration.: France has an embassy in Berlin and consulates-general in Düsseldorf, Frankfurt, Hamburg, Munich, Saarbrücken and Stuttgart.; Germany has an embassy in Paris and consulates-general in Bordeaux, Lyon, Marseille and Strasbourg.; Both countries are full members of the European Union and NATO. |
| Greece | 1833 | See France-Greece relations Embassy level relations were established in 1833 (only three years after the Greek independence). The two countries share membership of the European Union and NATO and maintain special relations. They were allies during both World Wars, Korean War and the Cold War and have never been adversaries of each other. Greece is a member of La Francophonie.: France has an embassy in Athens.; Greece has an embassy in Paris.; Both nations are members of the European Union, NATO and of the Council of Europe. |
| Holy See | | See France–Holy See relations: The Holy See has an Apostolic Nunciature in Paris.; France has an embassy to the Holy See based in Rome. |
| Hungary | | See France–Hungary relations: France has an embassy in Budapest.; Hungary has an embassy in Paris.; Both countries are full members of the European Union and NATO. |
| Iceland | | See France–Iceland relations: France has an embassy in Reykjavík.; Iceland has an embassy in Paris and 7 honorary consulates in Bordeaux, Caen, Dieppe, Lyon, Marseille, Nice, Strasbourg.; Both countries are NATO members.; France Foreign Affairs Ministry about relations with Iceland |
| Ireland | 1929 | See France–Ireland relations: France has an embassy in Dublin.; Ireland has an embassy in Paris and a consulate-general in Lyon.; Both countries are full members of the European Union and of the Council of Europe.; Both countries, throughout history, were very friendly with each other, and both fought against Great Britain cooperatively, especially during the 1798 Uprising; French Ministry of Foreign Affairs about relations with Ireland |
| Italy | | See France–Italy relations: France has an embassy in Rome and consulates-general in Milan and Naples.; Italy has an embassy in Paris and consulates-general in Lyon, Marseille, Metz and Nice.; Both countries are full members of the European Union and NATO. |
| Kosovo | 18 February 2008 | See France–Kosovo relations When Kosovo declared its independence from Serbia on 17 February 2008, France became one of the first countries to announce official recognition of sovereign Kosovo.: France has an embassy in Pristina.; Kosovo has an embassy in Paris. |
| Latvia | 30 August 1991 | See France–Latvia relations: France recognized Latvia on 26 January 1921. France has never recognised the annexation of Latvia by the former Soviet Union. France re-recognized Latvia on 27 August 1991.; France has an embassy in Riga.; Latvia has an embassy in Paris and 9 honorary consulates (in Bordeaux, Calais, Lyon, Marseille, Nancy, Nantes, Saint-Étienne, Strasbourg and Toulouse).; Both countries are full members of NATO and of the European Union. Since 2008, Latvia is an observer on the Francophonie.; French Ministry of Foreign Affairs about relations with Latvia; Latvian Ministry of Foreign Affairs about relations with France |
| Lithuania | | See France–Lithuania relations: France has an embassy in Vilnius.; Lithuania has an embassy in Paris and 5 honorary consulates (in Bordeaux, Marseille, Rouen, Troyes and Valence).; Both countries are full members of NATO and of the European Union. Since 1999, Lithuania is an observer on the Francophonie.; French Ministry of Foreign Affairs about relations with Lithuania; Lithuanian Ministry of Foreign affairs: list of bilateral treaties with Poland (in Lithuanian only) |
| Luxembourg | | See France–Luxembourg relations: France has an embassy in Luxembourg City.; Luxembourg has an embassy in Paris and a consulate-general in Strasbourg.; Both countries are full members of the European Union and NATO. |
| Malta | | The former president of France, Nicolas Sarkozy went to Malta on a private trip just after his election in May 2007.; French Foreign Ministry about relations with Malta; France has an embassy in Valletta.; Malta has an embassy in Paris.; Both countries are full members of the European Union and of the Council of Europe. |
| Moldova | | France opened an Embassy in Chişinău.; Moldova has an embassy in Paris.; Both countries are full members of the Council of Europe.; France is an EU member and Moldova is an EU candidate.; France and Moldova have signed a Defence Cooperation Agreement. |
| Monaco | | See France–Monaco relations: France has an embassy in Monte Carlo.; Monaco has an embassy in Paris. |
| Montenegro | 14 June 2006 | France has an embassy in Podgorica.; Montenegro has an embassy in Paris.; French Foreign Ministry about relations with Montenegro; France is an EU member and Montenegro is an EU candidate.; Both countries are full members of NATO. |
| Netherlands | | See France–Netherlands relations: Both countries fought in the Franco-Dutch War.; The two countries share a border in the Caribbean island of Saint Martin, to which the northern part of the island is a French overseas collectivity known as the Collectivity of Saint Martin, while the southern part of the island is a Dutch constituent country known as Sint Maarten.; France has an embassy in The Hague with consulates in Amsterdam, Groningen, Maastricht, Middelburg, Rotterdam, 's-Hertogenbosch, and Utrecht.; The Netherlands maintains an embassy in Paris with consulates in Ajaccio, Bordeaux, Brest, Calais, Le Havre, Lille, Lyon, Marseille, Montpellier, Nice, Strasbourg, and Toulouse.; Both nations are members of the European Union, NATO and of the Council of Europe. |
| North Macedonia | | France has an embassy in Skopje.; North Macedonia has an embassy in Paris.; Both countries are full members of NATO.; France is an EU member and North Macedonia is an EU candidate. |
| Norway | | See France–Norway relations: France has an embassy in Oslo.; Norway has an embassy in Paris.; Both countries are full members of NATO. |
| Poland | | See France–Poland relations Polish-French relations date several centuries, although they became really relevant only with times of French Revolution and reign of Napoleon I. Poles have been allies of Napoleon; large Polish community settled in France in the 19th century, and Poles and French were also allies during the interwar period. The official relations, having cooled down during the Cold War, have improved since the fall of communism. Currently both countries are part of the European Union and NATO.: France has an embassy in Warsaw and a consulate-general in Kraków.; Poland has an embassy in Paris and a consulate-general in Lyon.; Both nations are members of the European Union, NATO and of the Council of Europe. |
| Portugal | | See France–Portugal relations: France has an embassy in Lisbon.; Portugal has an embassy in Paris and consulates-general in Bordeaux, Lyon, Marseille, Strasbourg and a vice-consulate in Toulouse.; Both nations are members of the European Union, NATO and of the Council of Europe. |
| Romania | 1396 | See France–Romania relations: France has an embassy in Bucharest.; Romania has an embassy in Paris.; Both nations are members of the European Union, NATO and of the Council of Europe. |
| Russia | | See France–Russia relations After the breakup of the USSR in 1991, bilateral relations between France and Russia were warm. On 7 February 1992, France signed a bilateral treaty, recognizing Russia as a successor of the USSR. Good relations ended in 2022 as France gave strong support to Ukraine when Russia invaded.: France has an embassy in Moscow and consulates-general in Saint Petersburg and Yekaterinburg.; Russia has an embassy in Paris and consulates-general in Marseille and Strasbourg. |
| Serbia | 18 January 1879 | See France–Serbia relations: France has an embassy in Belgrade.; Serbia has an embassy in Paris and 2 consulates (in Lyon and Strasbourg).; France is an EU member and Serbia is an EU candidate.; Since 2006, Serbia is an observer on the Francophonie.; There are between 70,000 and 100,000 people of Serbian descent living in France.; French Ministry of Foreign Affairs about relations with Serbia; Serbian Ministry of Foreign Affairs about relations with France |
| Slovakia | 1993 | France has an embassy in Bratislava and 2 honorary consulates in Košice and Martin.; Slovakia has an embassy in Paris and 2 honorary consulates (in Grenoble and Marseille).; Both countries are full members of the European Union and NATO.; French Ministry of Foreign Affairs about the relation with Slovakia |
| Slovenia | | France has an embassy in Ljubljana.; Slovenia has an embassy in Paris.; Since 1999, Slovenia is an observer on the Francophonie.; Both countries are full members of the European Union and NATO.; French Ministry of Foreign Affairs about relations with Slovenia |
| Spain | | See France–Spain relations: France has an embassy in Madrid and consulates-general in Barcelona, Bilbao and Seville.; Spain has an embassy in Paris and maintains several consulates-general throughout France.; Both nations are members of the European Union, NATO and of the Council of Europe. |
| Sweden | | See France–Sweden relations: France has an embassy in Stockholm.; Sweden has an embassy in Paris.; Both countries are full members of the European Union, NATO and of the Council of Europe.; France fully supported Sweden's application to join NATO, which resulted in membership on 7 March 2024. |
| Switzerland | 1798 | See France–Switzerland relations: France has an embassy in Bern and consulates-general in Geneva and Zürich.; Switzerland has an embassy in Paris and consulates-general in Lyon, Marseille and Strasbourg. |
| Ukraine | 24 January 1992 | See France–Ukraine relations: France has an embassy in Kyiv.; Ukraine has an embassy in Paris.; Both countries are full members of the Council of Europe.; France is an EU member and Ukraine is an EU candidate.; Since 2006, Ukraine has been an observer on the Francophonie organisation.; French Foreign Ministry about relations with Ukraine |
| United Kingdom | | See France–United Kingdom relations British Prime Minister Keir Starmer with French President Emmanuel Macron in Paris, February 2025. France established diplomatic relations with the United Kingdom in 1396.: France maintains an embassy in London, and consulates general in London and Edinburgh.; The United Kingdom is accredited to France through its embassy in Paris, and consulates in Bordeaux and Marseille.; Both countries share common membership of the Council of Europe, European Court of Human Rights, G7, G20, the International Criminal Court, NATO, OECD, OSCE, and the World Trade Organization. Bilaterally the two countries have the Combined Joint Expeditionary Force, a Double Taxation Convention, and the Lancaster House Treaties. |

=== Oceania ===
| Country | Formal relations began | Notes |
|---|---|---|
| Australia | | See Australia–France relations In August 2009, Nicolas Sarkozy became the first serving French leader to visit Australia. The Courier Mail reported that "serious bilateral issues" for Sarkozy and Kevin Rudd to discuss included "the war in Afghanistan and global warming".: Australia has an embassy in Paris and consulates-general in Nouméa and Papeete.; France has an embassy in Canberra and a consulate-general in Sydney. |
| Fiji | | See Fiji–France relations Relations between France and Fiji are currently strained, due to France's condemnation of the coup d'état in Fiji in December 2006. Previously, Franco-Fiji bilateral relations had primarily been centred on military cooperation, with France assisting Fiji in surveiling its maritime zone, and on development aid. French military assistance was suspended after the coup. French aid to Fiji includes the providing of equipment for poor and isolated areas, and assistance in the development of renewable energy. France also provides Fiji with translations into English of French scientific documents pertaining to the Pacific area. France promotes French culture and the French language in Fiji through the presence of the Alliance Française and by encouraging the teaching of French in schools and at the University of the South Pacific. The French embassy in Suva is accredited to Kiribati, Nauru, Tonga and Tuvalu.: Fiji is accredited to France from its embassy in Brussels, Belgium.; France has an embassy in Suva. |
| Kiribati | | See France–Kiribati relations The two countries maintain official diplomatic relations, but no diplomatic presence on each other's territory; the French embassy in Suva is accredited to Kiribati. |
| Nauru | | In 1995, Nauru broke off relations diplomatic relations with France to protest French nuclear testing in the Pacific. Relations were resumed in 1997. Nauruan President Ludwig Scotty paid a State visit to Paris in June 2006, when he attended a France-Oceania multilateral summit. |
| New Zealand | | See France–New Zealand relations Relations between France and New Zealand have been rocky at the best of times, but more recently become much closer. Bilateral relations have been good since World War I and World War II, with both countries working extremely closely during either conflicts, but the relationship was severely jeopardised by the sinking of the Rainbow Warrior in Auckland on 10 July 1985 by French Direction Générale de la Sécurité Extérieure (DGSE) agents. New Zealand was put under fierce economic strain by France following the attack with French Government demanding the agents who carried out the attack to be released by the New Zealand government. Since then there has been some animosity among New Zealanders towards the French, but since the 20th anniversary of the bombing in 2005, there were signs that New Zealand had begun to warm to the French. There has been speculation that this acceptance of the French by the New Zealand people has a lot to do with the historic rivalry between both countries' Rugby teams.: France has an embassy in Wellington.; New Zealand has an embassy in Paris. |
| Papua New Guinea | 1976 | See France–Papua New Guinea relations Relations between the French Republic and the Independent State of Papua New Guinea are limited but cordial. Papua New Guinea is a member of the United Nations' Special Committee on Decolonization. The French government has noted what it calls Port Moresby's "moderate" attitude on the issue of the decolonisation of New Caledonia – which, like Papua New Guinea, is located in Melanesia. The French National Assembly maintains a Friendship Group with Papua New Guinea.: France has an embassy in Port Moresby.; Papua New Guinea is accredited to France from its embassy in Brussels, Belgium. |
| Solomon Islands | | Relations between both countries are very limited. |
| Vanuatu | | See France–Vanuatu relations |

== See also ==
- Deployments of the French military
- Evolution of the French Empire
- French colonial empire
- French colonisation of the Americas
- Francization, use of the language
- History of France
- International relations, 1648–1814
- International relations (1814–1919)
- Causes of World War I
- French entry into World War I
- International relations (1919–1939)
- List of diplomatic missions in France
- List of diplomatic missions of France
- Visa requirements for French citizens
