= Bangladesh–France relations =

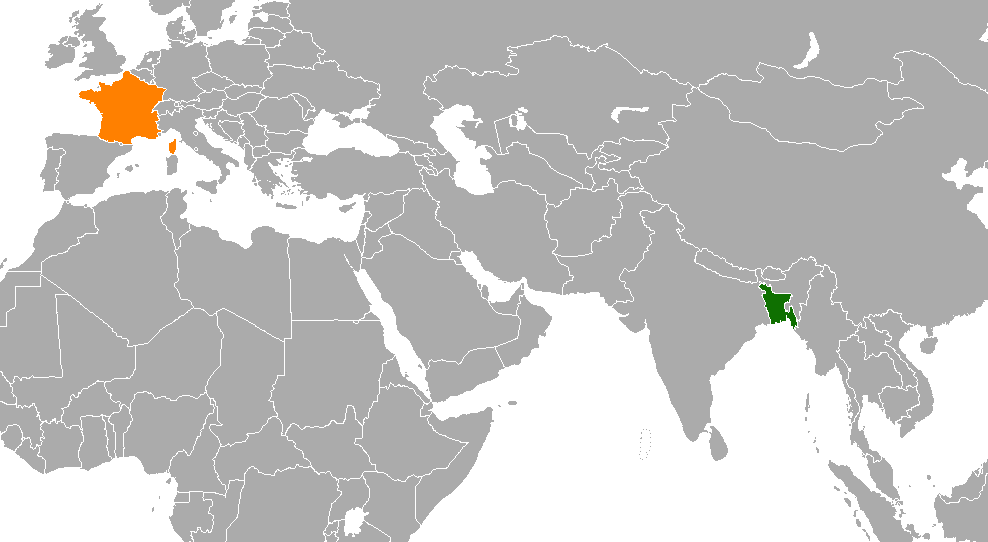

- Bangladesh: France

Bangladesh–France relations relate to the foreign relationship between Bangladesh and France.

== History ==
The French first arrived in Bengal during the late 17th century. They maintained trading posts in Dhaka and other cities. In 1757, France sent a contingent of troops to Bengal to fight against the British in the Battle of Plassey. On September 10th, 2023, French President Macron visited Bangladesh, in order to increase the countries cooperation in areas like climate change, trade, and technology.

In 2020, there were protests in several Muslim countries, including Bangladesh, over French President's Macron comments towards Islam, and a cartoon of the prophet Muhammed. The government of Bangladesh, however, was silent.

=== High level visits ===
In 1990, French President François Mitterrand paid an official visit to Bangladesh. Bangladeshi Prime Minister Sheikh Hasina paid an official visit to Paris in 1999. Former Bangladeshi Foreign Ministers Morshed Khan and Dipu Moni paid official visits to France in 2006 and 2010 respectively. French Defence Minister Florence Parly visited Bangladesh on 9 March 2020.In September 2023, French President Emmanuel Macron paid an official bilateral visit to Bangladesh on 10–11 September, becoming the first French president to visit the country in 33 years (since François Mitterrand's visit in 1990)."The state visit of HE President of the French Republic Emmanuel Macron to Bangladesh - September 10-11, 2023". Embassy of France in Bangladesh."Macron visits Bangladesh to 'consolidate' France's Indo-Pacific push". Al Jazeera. 11 September 2023.

== Cultural relations ==
Alliance Française has been promoting French culture in East Pakistan (now Bangladesh) since 1959. French archaeologists have worked with Bangladeshi colleagues on the excavation of Mahasthangarh since 1993 and have made a number of important discoveries.

== Economic relations ==
As of 2021, the bilateral trade between the two countries stood at $2.4 billion, of which Bangladesh's export to France amounts to $2.12 billion. France's export to the Bangladesh is $225.97 million. Bangladesh mainly exports knitwear, woven garments, frozen food, agricultural products, leather, jute and jute goods to France. France's main export items include chemical products, electronics, transport products, wood and paper. France is one of the largest markets for Bangladeshi garments.

== Resident diplomatic missions ==
- Bangladesh has an embassy in Paris.
- France has an embassy in Dhaka.
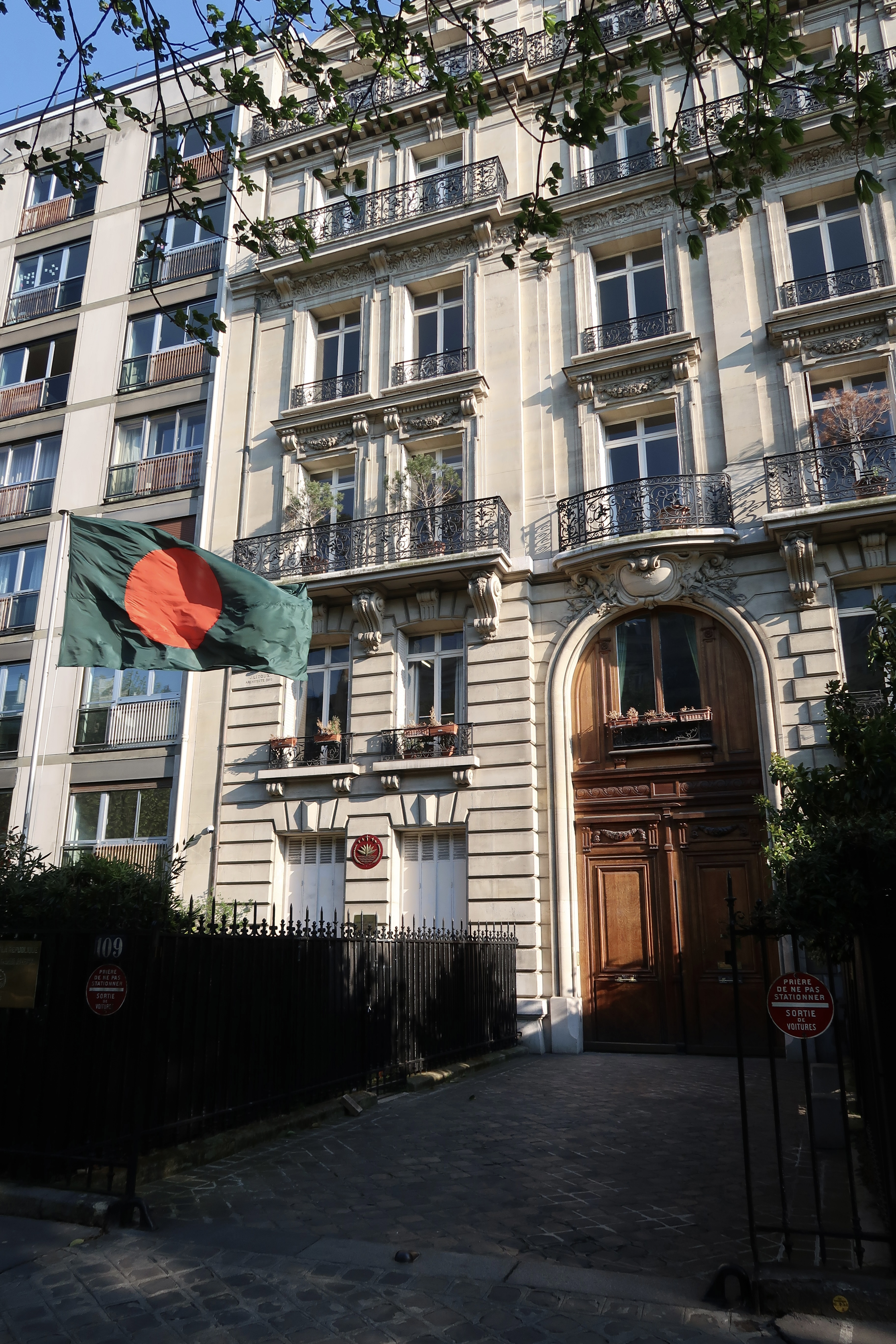
Embassy of Bangladesh in Paris

== See also ==
- Foreign relations of Bangladesh
- Foreign relations of France
