= Embassy of France, Chișinău =

Embassy of France in Chișinău
- Location: Central Chișinău
- Address: 6 Vlaicu Pârcălab St.
- Coordinates: 47°00′59″N 28°49′36″E
- Ambassador: Pascal Vagogne

The Embassy of France to Moldova is located in Chișinău.

== Ambassadors ==
From	To	Ambassador
1992	1996	Pierre Morel
1996	1999	Serge Smessow
1999	2003	Dominique Gazuy-Fromaget
2003	2007	Edmond Pamboukjian
2007	2011	Pierre Andrieu
2014	2017	Pascal Vagogne
2017	...	Pascal Le Deunff

== See also ==
- France–Moldova relations
