= France–Kazakhstan relations =

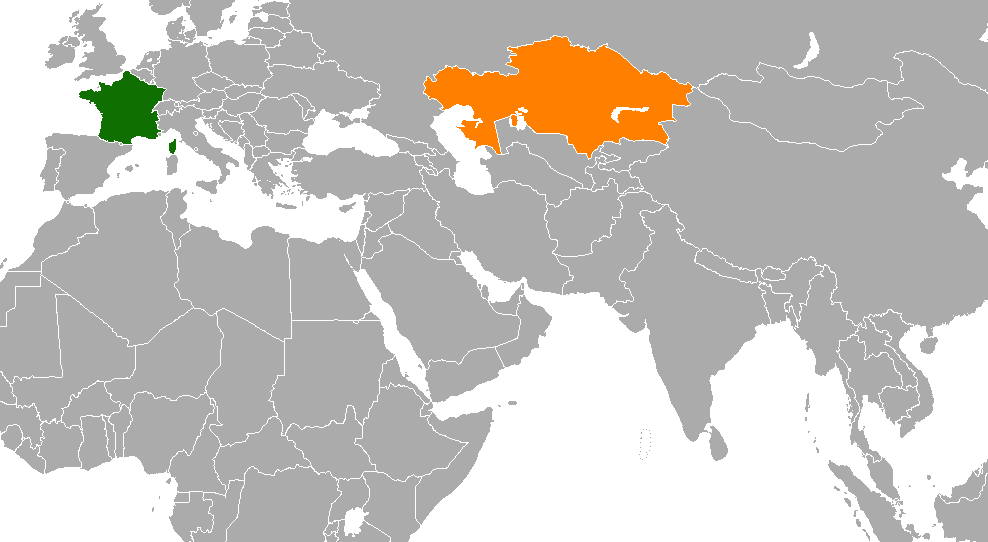

- France: Kazakhstan

France–Kazakhstan relations are the diplomatic relations between France and Kazakhstan. France has an embassy in Astana and a consulate-general in Almaty. Kazakhstan has an embassy in Paris. Both nations are members of the Organization for Security and Co-operation in Europe.

== History ==
First contacts between France and Kazakhstan took place in the 20th century. At that time, the country was a constituent republic of the Soviet Union and hosted the Baikonur Cosmodrome — the crown jewel of the Soviet space program — visits to this central Asian republic were reserved for high-stakes diplomatic validation. Charles de Gaulle became the first Western leader to visit Kazakhstan and was allowed into the ultra-secretive Baikonur Cosmodrome in Kazakhstan. General Secretary Leonid Brezhnev personally accompanied him to witness the live launch of a Soviet meteorological satellite (Kosmos-122). This extraordinary gesture aimed to break France away from total reliance on NATO military infrastructure. In 1970, his successor, President Georges Pompidou, was also granted access to Baikonur. He watched the launch of a Soyuz spacecraft, demonstrating how the USSR repeatedly leveraged its Central Asian space hub to court French diplomacy.

After the Dissolution of the Soviet Union, Kazakhstan became an independent nation in December 1991. France and Kazakhstan established diplomatic relations on 25 January 1992, with France becoming the first European nation to recognize Kazakhstan. In September 1993, French President François Mitterrand paid an official visit to Kazakhstan. In June 2008, both nations signed a strategic partnership agreement and in 2010, both nations created a joint presidential commission, establishing yearly visits by both heads of state and arranging for yearly consultations between ministers of foreign affairs of both nations, beginning in 2011.

In 2008, France transferred its embassy from the former capital of Almaty to the country's new capital of Astana. In 2010, the two countries created a Franco-Kazakh Presidential Commission, which takes the form of an annual meeting between the two Heads of State. The Alliance Française operates four centers in Kazakhstan, in Astana, Almaty, Shymkent and Karaganda. In 2017, both nations celebrated 25 years of diplomatic relations. That same year, France participated in the Expo 2017 being held in Astana.

== High-level visits ==
Presidential visits from France to Kazakhstan

- President Charles de Gaulle (1966)
- President Georges Pompidou (1970)
- President François Mitterrand (1993)
- President Nicolas Sarkozy (2009)
- President François Hollande (2014)
- President Emmanuel Macron (2023)

Presidential visits from Kazakhstan to France

- President Nursultan Nazarbayev (2008, 2011, 2012, 2013, 2015)
- President Kassym-Jomart Tokayev (2022, 2024)

== Bilateral relations ==
Since 1992, both nations have signed several bilateral agreements such as a Treaty of Friendship, Understanding and Cooperation (1992); Agreement on Cultural Cooperation (1993) and an Agreement on direct air and train service for French military personnel and equipment traveling to and from Afghanistan and for the use of Shymkent airbase (2009).

== Transport ==
The longest European route, the E40, runs from France to Kazakhstan.

== Education ==
The public association “Alliance Française” is a cultural and educational non-profit, self-governing organization operating with the support of the Embassy of France. The Campus France committee in Kazakhstan offers free consultations, helping students with career guidance, choosing institutions in France, and assisting with the application process. These services are available in the offices in Almaty and Astana and are free of charge. Campus France also helps with document translations — this can be done free of charge at the Alliance Française centers in Almaty and Astana.

Dual degree programs between France and Kazakhstan offer students a unique opportunity to study both at a Kazakhstani university and at a French institution. Upon completion, graduates receive two officially recognized diplomas: one from the Kazakhstani university and another from the French partner. There are several scholarship programs that partially or fully cover study costs in France:

- Abay–Vern program — about 45 scholarships, covering tuition, accommodation, insurance, and visa formalities.
- MOPGA (Make Our Planet Great Again) — around 10 master’s scholarships in sustainable development and ecology.
- Eiffel Excellence Scholarship — support for talented students under 25; covers tuition and registration fees.

== Trade ==
It is worth noting that more than 170 French companies are successfully operating in Kazakhstan today. France is one of Kazakhstan's key trading partners. According to the results of 2022, the volume of mutual trade between the Republic of Kazakhstan and France has returned to pre-pandemic levels and amounted to $4 billion, an increase of 35.3% compared to the previous year (exports from Kazakhstan - $3.1 billion, imports - $0.9 billion). In 2021, the volume of trade amounted to $3.1 billion.

France is one of the most important trade, economic and political partners and one of the five largest investors in Kazakhstan since 2005, having invested more than $17 billion in investments. Kazakhstan is France's largest trading partner in Central Asia. French multinational companies such as Airbus, Air Liquide, Assystem, Alstom, Orano Mining, Engie, Peugeot, EDF, Renault, Saint-Gobain, Total S.A. and Vicat, among others, operate in Kazakhstan.

== List of French ambassadors to Kazakhstan ==
1. 1992 1994 Bertrand Fessard de Foucault
2. 1994 1999 Alain Richard
3. 1999 2003 Serge Smessov
4. 2003 2006 Gerard Perrole
5. 2006 2009 Alain Cuanon
6. 2009 2013 Jean-Charles Bertonnet
7. 2013 2017 Francis Etienne
8. 2017 2020 Philippe Martinet
9. 2020 2024 Didier Caness
10. 2024 n. v. Sylvain Guiaugue

== Resident diplomatic missions ==
- France has an embassy in Astana and a consulate-general in Almaty.
- Kazakhstan has an embassy in Paris and a consulate-general in Strasbourg.

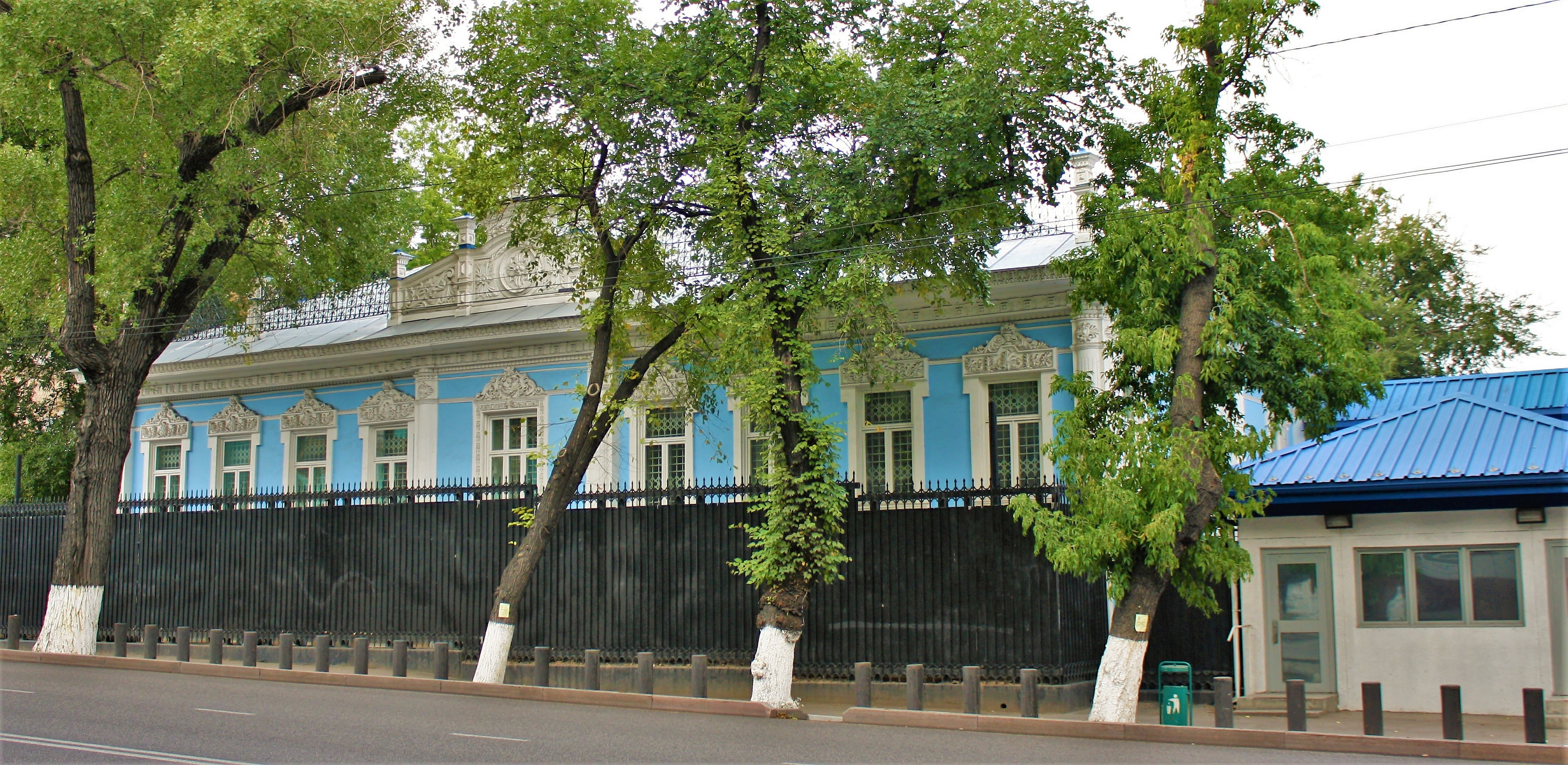
Consulate-General of France in Almaty

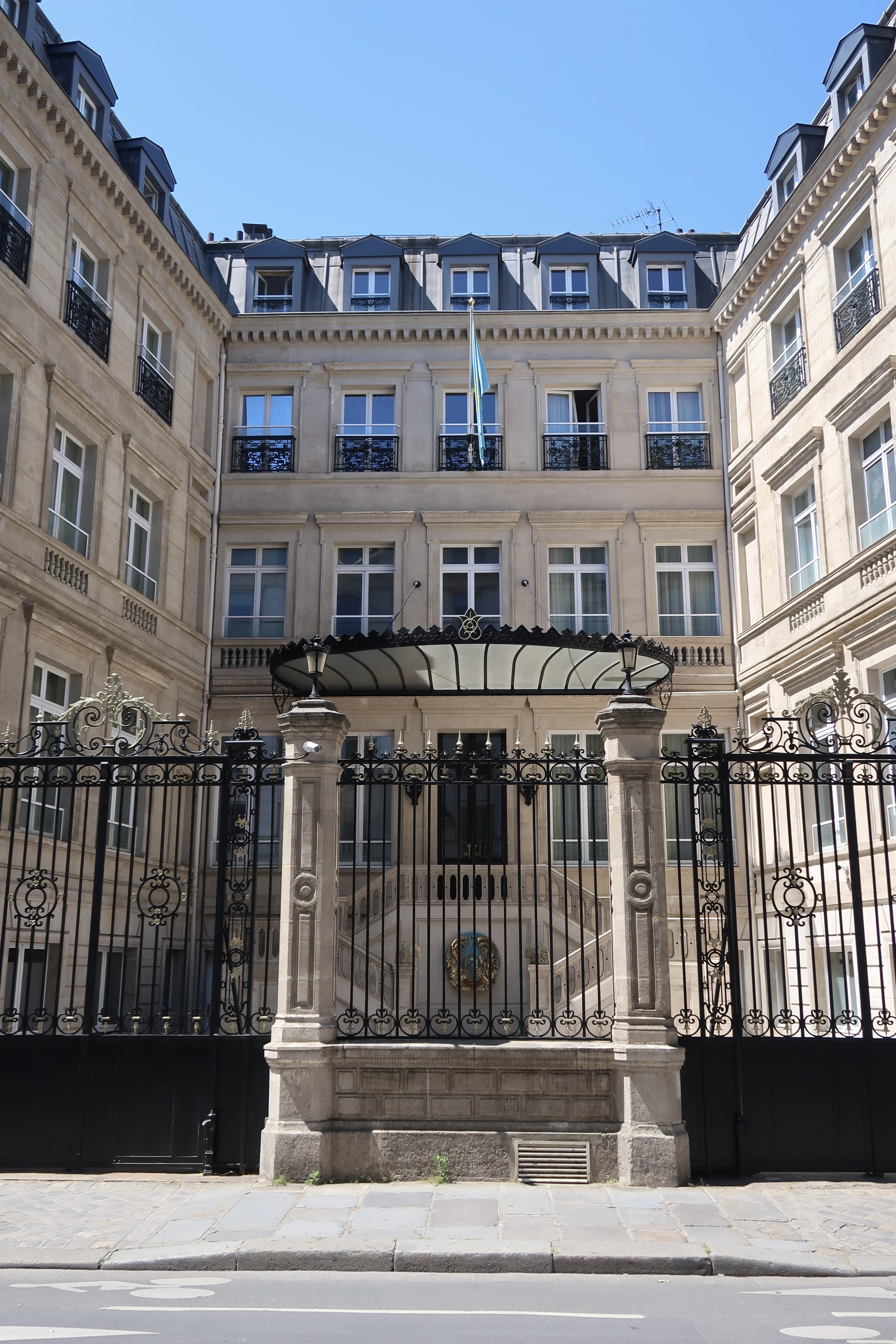
Embassy of Kazakhstan in Paris

== See also ==
- Foreign relations of France
- Foreign relations of Kazakhstan
