= France–Lesotho relations =

- France: Lesotho

France–Lesotho relations are bilateral relations between France and Lesotho. France has an embassy in Maseru, Lesotho, while Lesotho does not have an embassy in Paris.

== History ==
Historically, France and Lesotho have had good relations, due to the presence of French Protestant Missionaries in 1820. In 1868, these missionaries warned the king of Lesotho at the time, Moshoeshoe I to make Lesotho a British protectorate because of the expansion of the Boers, thus, sparing the kingdom from Apartheid.

== State visits ==
While relations are modest, they are good shown by visits to France by Letsie III for the Africa-France Summit in 2007, and COP-21 in 2015, and a visit to Lesotho by Jean-Marie Bockel in 2007.
