= List of ambassadors of Portugal to France =

Ambassador of Portugal to France
- Incumbent; Francisco Ribeiro de Menezes since September 17, 2025
- Style: His Excellency (formal); Mr. Ambassador (informal)
- Residence: 1, Rue de Noisiel, 75116 Paris
- Appointer: President of the Portuguese Republic with the advice and consent of the Government
- Website: Embaixada de Portugal em França

The Ambassador of Portugal to France is the highest legal representative of Portugal to France through the Embassy of Portugal in Paris.

== History ==
In 1485, John II of Portugal and Charles VIII of France concluded a Treaty of Alliance and Commerce. In 1536, a Treaty of Friendship and Alliance was signed between John III of Portugal and Francis I of France.

In January 1641, the first Portuguese Embassy was sent to France, led by Francisco de Melo and António Coelho de Carvalho, with João Francisco Barreto serving as Secretary. The French Crown had supported the Portuguese Restoration, which led the Portuguese Diplomacy to seek a “formal alliance” in the context of the Thirty Years' War, and the conflict between France and Spain.
Diplomatic relations were severed in 1704, due the War of the Spanish Succession, and re-established on 18 August 1715.

The Embassy of Portugal in situated in Paris. Portugal also has 5 General Consulates (Paris,Bordeaux,Lyon,Marseille,Strasburg), 1 Vice-Consulate in Toulouse and 1 Consular Office in Nantes, as well as 9 Honorary Consulates in France.

== List of representatives ==
Portuguese Ambassadors in France
Name	Portrait	Period	Remarks
Francisco de Melo (pt) and António Coelho de Carvalho		25 March 1641 –13 June 1641	Together Ambassador, im March 1641 accredited
Frei Dinis de Lencastre		21 / 26 August 1641 –1641	Probably Secret Ambassador, on 22 June 1641 accredited
Vasco Luís da Gama (Conde da Vidigueira) (pt)		15 August 1642 –February(?) 1646	Ambassador
Luís Pereira de Castro (pt)		1643	Ambassador
Álvaro Pires de Castro e Sousa (Marquês de Cascais) (pt)		19 April 1644 –20 June 1644	Special Ambassador
António Moniz de Carvalho		1646 –11 February 1648	Permanent Representative, in February 1646 accredited
Vasco Luís da Gama (Marquês de Nisa) (pt)		1647 –May(?) 1649	Special Ambassador, on 8 February 1647 accredited
Cristovão Soares de Abreu		1648 until 1651	Permanent Representative
Francisco de Sousa Coutinho		17 April 1651 –12 October 1655	Ambassador
Feliciano Dourado		1652– August/September 1653	Permanent Representative
Frei Domingos dos Rosário		1656 –June 1657	
Francisco Ferreira de Rebelo		1658	Probably Permanent Representative
Feliciano Dourado		1658 –14 July 1659	Permanent Representative
João da Costa (Conde de Soure)		1659 –2 August 1660	Special Ambassador, on 13 June 1659 accredited
Rui Teles de Meneses		1663	Envoy
Francisco Ferreira Rebelo		June 1663 –18 September 1663	Permanent Representative
Francisco de Melo Manuel da Câmara		1663 (from June)	Special Envoy
Francisco de Melo e Torres (Marquês de Sande) (pt)		November 1663 –November 1664	Ambassador
Marquês de Sande		1665 until 1666	Ambassador, in October 1665 accredited
Francisco Ferreira Rebelo		1667– 1 May 1668	Permanent Representative
Duarte Ribeiro de Macedo (pt)		1 May 1668 –1676	Envoy, 1668 accredited
Salvador Taborda Portugal		17 December 1677 –8 December 1690	Envoy
João de Ataíde e Castro		10 July 1684 –1684	unranked
Francisco Pereira da Silva		1691– 22 November 1695	Special-Envoy
Luís Álvares de Castro (2nd Marquês de Cascais)		21 November 1695 –19 November 1699	Special-Ambassador, on 26 February 1696 accredited
Luís da Cunha			Special-Envoy, Probably 1698 until 1699
José da Cunha Brochado (pt)		1699– May 1704	Envoy
Luís da Cunha		30 September 1701 –15 April 1704	Ambassador
Luís Manuel da Câmara (Conde da Ribeira Grande)		18 August 1715 –13 February 1721	Special-Ambassador
Marco António de Azevedo Coutinho (pt)		29 March 1721 –1725	Special-Envoy
Luís da Cunha		1723 until 1725	Minister Plenipotentiary, 1723 accredited
Francisco Mendes de Góis		1726 until 1742	Diplomatic Agent
Luís da Cunha		1740– 9 October 1749	Ambassador
Gonçalo Manuel Galvão de Lacerda		1750 until 1755	Special-Envoy
José Galvão de Lacerda (Botado de Pina Macedo)		1755– December 1756	Minister
António Francisco de Saldanha da Gama		1756– September 1757	Ambassador
Pedro da Costa de Almeida Salema		July 1757 –1762	unranked
Martinho de Melo e Castro (pt)		October 1762 –29 March 1763	Special-Envoy, on 13 October 1762 accredited
Vicente de Sousa Coutinho		5 July 1763 –26 May 1772	Minister Plenipotentiary, in July 1763 accredited
Vicente de Sousa Coutinho		26 May 1772 –8 May 1792	Ambassador, on 26 May 1772 accredited
Henrique Roberto Tomasini		1792 until 1796	Chargé d’affaires
José António dos Santos Branco		8 May 1792 –1796	Chargé d’affaires
António de Araújo e Azevedo		15 October 1796 –17 July 1798	Special-Envoy. One month in prison.
José António dos Santos Branco		1799 until 1801	Chargé d’affaires
José Maria de Sousa		7 April 1802 –18 November 1804	Special-Envoy and Minister Plenipotentiary, in April 1802 accredited
Lourenço de Lima (pt)		17 August 1804 –18 November 1804	Special-Ambassador
Lourenço de Lima		18 November 1804 –14 October 1807	Ambassador, on 18 November 1804 accredited
Pedro José de Meneses Coutinho (Marquês de Marialva) (pt)		2 October 1814 –2 December 1814	Special-Ambassador
Francisco Maria de Brito		3 October 1814 –22 July 1817	Chargé d’affaires, on 3 October 1814 in function
Marquês de Marialva		1816 until 1817	Ambassador, on 30 June 1816 accredited
Francisco Maria de Brito		1817	Special-Envoy and Minister Plenipotentiary, on 22 July 1817 accredited
Marquês de Marialva		1818– 31 December 1821	Ambassador
José Diogo Mascarenhas Neto (pt)		30 December 1821 –11 July 1822	Chargé d’affaires
João Francisco de Oliveira		11 July 1822 –27 October 1822	Chargé d’affaires
João Ferreira da Costa Sampaio		27 October 1822 –16 January 1823	Representative, on 27 October 1822 accredited
Marquês de Marialva		4 April 1823 –23 November 1823	Ambassador, on 10 July 1823 accredited
Francisco Maria de Brito		24 December 1823 –March 1825	Special-Envoy and Minister Plenipotentiary
Joaquim Conde de Oriola		10 June 1825 –5 November 1825	
Pedro de Melo Breyner (pt)		5 November 1825 –26 September 1826	Special-Envoy and Minister Plenipotentiary, on 5 November 1825 accredited
Nuno Barbosa de Figueiredo		26 September 1826 –4 June 1828	Chargé d’affaires
Conde de Vila Real (pt)		October 1826–?	Special-Envoy and Minister Plenipotentiary
Conde da Ponte		9 June 1828 –18 June 1833	Minister Plenipotentiary
Nuno Barbosa de Figueiredo		8 February 1830 –27 May 1830	Chargé d’affaires
Francisco de Almeida Portugal (2nd Conde do Lavradio)		27 June 1830 –10 June 1833	Minister Plenipotentiary
Visconde de Alcochete		18 June 1833 –12 May 1834	Interim Chargé d’affaires, on 7 October 1833 accredited
Luís António de Abreu e Lima (Visconde da Carreira) (pt)		12 May 1834 –8 June 1840	Minister Plenipotentiary, on 17 May 1834 accredited
Nuno Barbosa de Figueiredo		12 December 1836 –1 October 1837	Special-Chargé d’affaires
Nuno Barbosa de Figueiredo		8 June 1840 –6 December 1841	Interim Chargé d’affaires
Visconde da Carreira		7 December 1841 –30 May 1847	Minister Plenipotentiary, Probably on 7 December 1841 accredited
Simão da Silva Ferraz de Lima e Castro (Conde de Rendufe)		30 May 1847 –23 January 1848	Minister Plenipotentiary, on 31 May 1847 accredited
Francisco José de Paiva Pereira (Barão de Paiva)		24 January 1848 –21 July 1850	Interim Chargé d’affaires, on 30 July 1848 accredited
Barão de Paiva		10 August 1850 –11 November 1851	Minister Plenipotentiary, on 31 August 1850 accredited
Conde da Azinhaga		11 November 1851 –20 October 1852	Minister Plenipotentiary, on 11 November 1851 accredited
Barão de Paiva		27 October 1852 –22 October 1868	Minister Plenipotentiary, on 21 October 1852 accredited
António José de Ávila (Conde de Ávila)		13 November 1868 –25 January 1869	Minister Plenipotentiary, on 20 November 1868 accredited
João Carlos de Saldanha Oliveira e Daun (Duque de Saldanha)		14 March 1869 –19 October 1869	Minister Plenipotentiary, on 14 March 1869 accredited
Visconde de Lancastre		20 October 1869 –26 February 1870	Interim Chargé d’affaires
José Maria do Casal Ribeiro (Conde do Casal Ribeiro) (pt)		27 February 1870 –30 June 1870	Minister Plenipotentiary, on 27 February 1870 accredited
Visconde de Lancastre		3 July 1870 –17 October 1870	Interim Chargé d’affaires
Visconde de Seisal (pt)		17 October 1870 –8 January 1874	Minister Plenipotentiary, on 24 October 1870 accredited
Barão de Santos		9 January 1874 –23 May 1874	Interim Chargé d’affaires
José da Silva Mendes Leal (pt)		23 May 1874 –27 July 1883	Minister Plenipotentiary, on 23 May 1874 accredited
João de Andrade Corvo		27 July 1883 –2 June 1886	Minister Plenipotentiary, on 27 July 1883 accredited
Joaquim Tomás Lobo de Ávila (Conde de Valbom) (pt)		26 June 1886 –30 January 1890	Minister Plenipotentiary, on 1 July 1886 accredited
Miguel Martins Dantas (pt)		18 March 1890 –1 August 1891	Minister Plenipotentiary, on 25 March 1890 accredited
Emygdio Julyo Navarro (pt)		7 August 1891 –8 June 1894	Minister Plenipotentiary, on 17 November 1891 accredited
Conde de Selir		9 June 1894 –10 August 1894	Interim Chargé d’affaires
Tomás de Sousa Rosa (pt)		10 August 1894 –12 October 1910	Minister Plenipotentiary, on 30 August 1894 accredited
António Carlos de Sousa dos Santos Bandeira		7 October 1910 –25 April 1911	Interim Chargé d’affaires
João Pinheiro Chagas		25 April 1911 –31 December 1923	Minister Plenipotentiary, on 30 January 1912 accredited
João Maria Cisneiros Ferreira		29 December 1923 –27 March 1924	Interim Chargé d’affaires
António Joaquim Ferreira da Fonseca (pt)		27 March 1924 –23 July 1926	Minister Plenipotentiary, on 4 April 1924 accredited
João Maria Cisneiros Ferreira		23 July 1926 –25 August 1926	Interim Chargé d’affaires
Armado Humberto da Gama Ochôa (pt)		25 August 1926 –9 June 1941	Minister Plenipotentiary, on 18 October 1926 accredited, Legation transferred to Vichy in 1940
José Caeiro da Mata		11 July 1941 –14 September 1944	Minister Plenipotentiary, on 18 July 1941 accredited (Official Residence in Vichy), left his post on 30 December 1943
Carlos Pedro Pinto Ferreira		4 July 1943 –15 September 1944	Interim Chargé d’affaires, Official Residence in Vichy
Augusto de Castro Sampaio Côrte Real (pt)		(10?) February 1945 –29 July 1947	Minister Plenipotentiary, on 10 March 1945 accredited, Official Residence again in Paris
Marcello Gonçalves Nunes Duarte Mathias		30 July 1947 –18 April 1948	Minister Plenipotentiary, on 8 June 1947 accredited
Marcello Gonçalves Nunes Duarte Mathias		19 April 1948 –29 September 1958	Ambassador, on 20 April 1948 accredited, Legation elevated to Embassy
Manuel Nunes da Silva		29 September 1958 –25 February 1959	Interim Chargé d’affaires
António Augusto Braga Leite de Faria		25 February 1959 –22 May 1961	Ambassador, on 12 March 1959 accredited
Marcelo Gonçalves Nunes Duarte Mathias		23 May 1961 –15 August 1971	Ambassador, on 3 June 1961 accredited, left his post on 19 July 1971
Mário Júlio de Melo Freitas		19 July 1971 –20 October 1971	Interim Chargé d’affaires
Alfredo Lencastre da Veiga		20 October 1971 –29 August 1974	Ambassador, on 16 November 1971
José Manuel Borges Gama Cornélio da Silva		29 August 1974 –23 December 1974	Interim Chargé d’affaires
António Antero Coimbra Martins (pt)		23 December 1974 –30 June 1979	Ambassador, on 23 December 1974 accredited
António José Aniceto Siqueira Freire		2 July 1979 –17 August 1983	Ambassador, on 12 July 1979 accredited
Manuel Moreira de Andrade		17 August 1983 –30 January 1984	Interim Chargé d’affaires
Walter Ruivo Pinto Gomes Rosa		30 January 1984 –21 February 1985	Ambassador, on 23 February 1984 accredited
Luis Gaspar da Silva (pt)		14 June 1985 –6 November 1990	Ambassador, on 3 July 1985 accredited
José Maria de Almeida Sherman de Lemos Macedo		15 November 1990 –16 March 1995	Ambassador, on 6 December 1990 accredited
José César Paulouro das Neves		26 April 1995 –29 April 1999	Ambassador, on 7 June 1995 accredited
Leornado Charles de Zaffiri Duarte Mathias (pt)		30 April 1999 –9 February 2001	Ambassador, on 18 May 1999 accredited
António Victor Martins Monteiro		8 March 2001 –16 July 2004	Ambassador
João Rosa Lã (de)		22 October 2004 –8 March 2006	Ambassador
António Victor Martins Monteiro		20 March 2006 –1 February 2009	Ambassador
Francisco Seixas da Costa		2 February 2009 –27 January 2013	Ambassador, on 7 July 2009 accredited
José Filipe Mendes Moraes Cabral		1 February 2013 –27 November 2017	Ambassador, on 22 February 2013 accredited
Jorge Ryder Torres Pereira		12 December 2017 –2022	Ambassador, on 18 December 2017 accredited
José Augusto Duarte		2022 –2025	Ambassador
Francisco Ribeiro de Menezes (de)		since 2025	Ambassador

== See also ==
Portugal–France relations
