= Barbados–France relations =

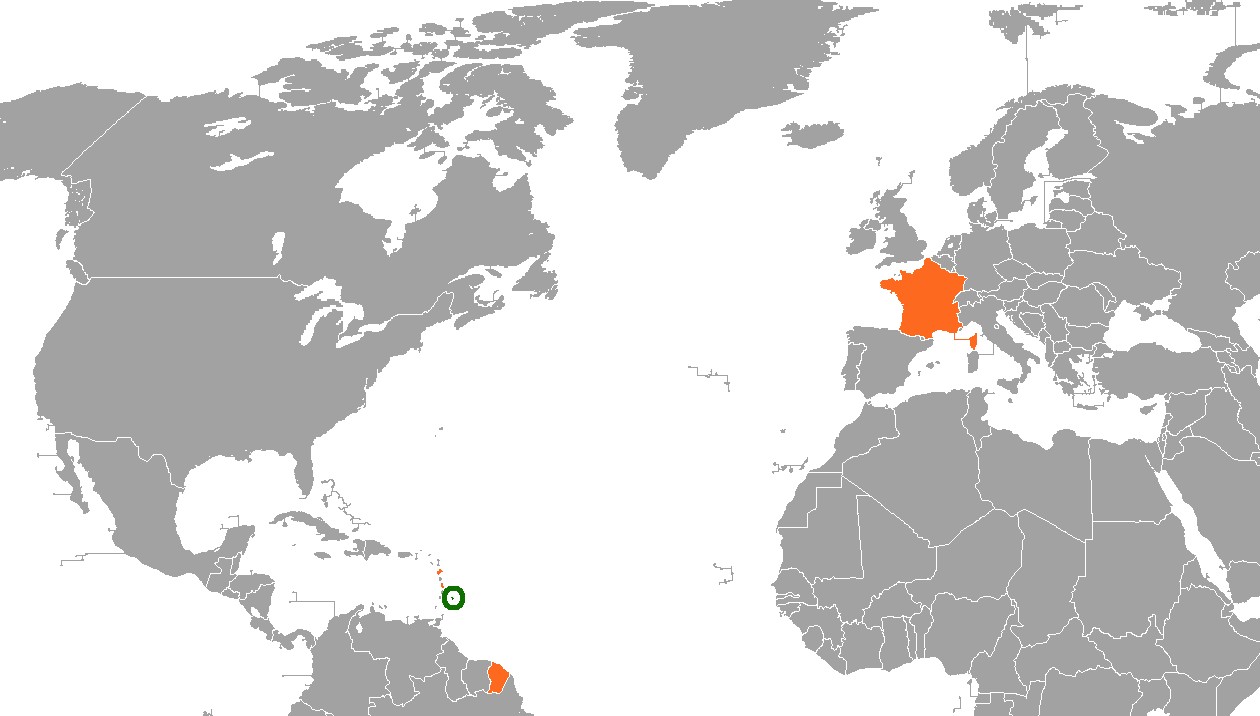
- Barbados: France

Barbados–France relations are the bilateral relations between the two countries, Barbados and France. Both countries have established diplomatic relations on May 3, 1968. Barbados is represented in France through its embassy in Brussels (Belgium). France is represented in Barbados through its embassy in Castries (Saint Lucia), led by and an additional honorary consulate in Bridgetown.

== Bilateral relations ==
The bilateral relations and trade between the two nations remain modest. In 2006, France exported to Barbados mainly: electrical equipment, wood, paper, and cardboard products. Barbados also has trade with France's territories in the Caribbean, such as Guadeloupe and Martinique. The Government of France supports 22 programmes in Barbados. Ties, including trade between Barbados and the French Departments in the Americas, have been steadily increasing. Attention in Barbados is currently being paid towards the creation of the "CARIFORUM French Caribbean Task Force" which will guide the way forward on regularised cooperation with the overseas areas of France.

In 2006 the former Prime Minister Owen Arthur had announced that Barbados would begin to settle its maritime boundaries with France due to Martinique's overlapping maritime boundary with Barbados. Discussions were carried out and successfully settled the maritime boundary between France and Barbados.

In 2007 the Dominican Republic and Caribbean Community bloc known as CARIFORUM began final negotiations for an Economic Partnership Agreement (EPA) between the Caribbean and European Union regions. During the negotiations an intense debate developed between Barbadian and French authorities over a provision that would allow certain classes of Caribbean nationals to be granted free movement within the European Union in exchange for the removal of tariffs on European products such as automobiles and mobile phones to the Caribbean.

The Barbadian Prime Minister Owen Arthur said the disagreement threatened to derail talks and stating to the media:

"The Caribbean could clearly not enter any new trade arrangement with anybody and accept a limitation on market access to our cultural workers, our artistes and our entertainers when we give people access to our markets. [ . . . ] "The heads have made a very clear decision that we could not conclude the agreement with Europe at all unless there is a removal on the restriction".

Talks proceeded shortly after and the agreement was agreed upon between the two regions on 16 December 2007.

As a followup of the Economic Partnership Agreement, in May 2009 the European Union (Schengen Area) signed a visa waiver agreement with Barbados and five other nations around the world allowing the citizens of the nations involved to travel visa free for up to three months to each other's territories. The visa-waiver agreement covers both Barbados and France however initially did not cover the French departments of the Caribbean. The Barbados Government indicated though that negotiations would be on-going to reach an agreement with France to allow for visa-free travel to the French Territories and Outer Departments (French: départements d'outre-mer and territoires d'outre-mer) in future.

The Barbadian private sector organisation known as the Private Sector Trade Team (PSTT) has taken an increasingly active interest in encouraging Barbadians businesses to expand their trade with the territories of France under the same EPA agreement.

French citizens in Barbados held the second Bastille Day celebration in 2009. The celebration at Brandon's Beach, Saint Michael was sponsored by the French Honorary Consulate in Barbados, as well as the Mount Gay Rum company. During the event it was outlined that Alliance Française de Bridgetown was actively pursuing several initiatives with the Barbadian Ministry of Education concerning French culture.

In 2009 the Barbados Tourism Authority began placing large emphasis on developing air-links between the French West Indies and Barbados through the sponsorship of charter flights.

In September 2009 the French Frigate "The Ventôse", commanded by Captain Pascal Le Barbier docked in Bridgetown, Barbados following a joint anti-drug campaign by both nations. During the visit the Ambassador of France in Trinidad & Tobago and Barbados, Mr. Michel Trinquier visited with French nationals living in Barbados.

In June 2010 French officials from Martinique's Regional Council and Chamber of Commerce visited Barbados for a three-day dialogue on formal cultural exchanges and joint-collaboration between industries in the two countries.

In July 2011 the French Mayor Jose Toribio of Lamentin, Guadeloupe, toured over a dozen primary schools in Barbados. He met with the Barbadian Minister of Education, Ronald Jones where both counterparts discussed several avenues of cooperation between Barbados and France including a student and teacher exchanges and cooperation in furthering an English–French immersion between Barbados and the French Departments. The leaders also spoke of a desire for a more regional approach to education.

In February 2023 France’s Minister of State for Development, Franchophonie and International Partnerships, Chrysoula Zacharopoulou visited Barbados on an official dialuogue and to foster updated relations. One month later the Barbados Prime Minister visited with her counterpart in Paris, President Emmanuel Macron to identify common positions regarding upcoming talks on mitigating human global effects on the environment and climate.

In 2024 it is expected Barbadians along with several other nations will be required to have their travel vetted by the EU's 'European Travel Information and Authorisation System.

In 2026 the territorial council of Martinique and Barbados pledged closer cooperation and signed a raft of deals covering the fields of: cultural and creative industries, sports, education, vocational training, disaster risk management, health, tourism, fisheries, and trade facilitation.

== See also ==
- Foreign relations of Barbados
- Foreign relations of France
- France–Americas relations
- Barbados–France Maritime Delimitation Agreement
