= List of ambassadors of Portugal to Austria =

Wikimedia list article

The List of Portuguese ambassadors to Austria enumerates the ambassadors of the Portugal to Austria.

The two nations have maintained diplomatic relations since 1667. These relations were interrupted on three occasions: briefly between 1822 (the Liberal Revolution in Portugal) and 1847; during the First World War (1914–1918, with diplomatic relations resuming in 1922); and following the annexation of Austria by Nazi Germany (1938–1945, with full diplomatic relations restored in 1954).

Portugal maintains its embassy in the Austrian capital, Vienna, at Opernring 1. In addition, there are Portuguese honorary consulates in Salzburg, Innsbruck, and Graz.

== List of representatives ==
Portuguese Ambassadors in Austria
Name	Portrait	Period	Remarks
Flag of the Kingdom of Portugal (1667–1706)
Carlos José de Ligne (pt)		13 April 1696–August 1696	First Portuguese Diplomat in Vienna; arrived 16 November 1695
Francisco de Sousa Pacheco		20 April 1698 –20 May 1698	arrived 5 April 1698
Flag of the Kingdom of Portugal (1706–1816)
Barão de Tinti (de)		1708–1726	
Fernão Teles da Silva (pt)		7 June 1708– 25 October 1708	Special Ambassador, arrived 23 February 1708
João Gomes da Silva		19 February 1726– 29 November 1738	
Domingos de Araújo Soares Beneficiado		1737	Agent
Sebastião José de Carvalho e Melo		1745– 3 September 1749	Minister Plenipotentiary from 12 March 1747, initially only an emissary
Ambrósio Pereira Freire de Andrade e Castro		21 May 1752– 14 November 1770	arrived 20 May 1752; Father of Gomes Freire de Andrade
Manuel Pereira de Sousa		1770	
José de Sá Pereira		15 August 1772 –July 1775	arrived 9 August 1772
António Rangel Pereira de Sá		July 1775– 3 September 1780	arrived 9 July 1775
Miguel de Portugal		1779 (?)	
Graf Carl August von Oeynhausen		3 September 1780 –2 June 1791	arrived 27 August 1780
Agostinho Nery da Silva		September 1784 –February 1795	Chargé d'affaires
Alexandre de Sousa e Holstein		1790?	
Visconde de Anadia (pt)		1791?	
Rodrigo de Sousa Coutinho		1793	
Lourenço de Lima (pt)		25 December 1795 –30 January 1801	no longer active on-site since 10 November 1799
Joaquim José de Miranda Rebelo		10 November 1799 –1801	Chargé d'affaires
José Maria de Sousa		1801– 22 December 1801	Ambassador and Special Envoy
Francisco José de Horta Machado		1802	
Joaquim Lobo da Silveira		1814	
Visconde da Torre Bela (pt)		1815	
Marquês de Marialva		1816?– 6 April 1818	Special Envoy
Flag of the United Kingdom of Portugal, Brazil, and the Algarves (1816–1822)
Rodrigo Navarro de Andrade		6 July 1816– 6 June 1817	Interim-Chargé d'affaires, arrived 1 July 1816
Joaquim José de Miranda Rebelo		6 June 1817– 21 February 1818	Interim-Chargé d'affaires
Rodrigo Navarro de Andrade		6 April 1818– 9 May 1822	2nd term, this time as ambassador and special envoy
João Freire de Andrade Salazar e Eça		1822	
Rodrigo Navarro de Andrade		5 September 1823 –22 July 1828	3nd term; became 1824 Baron of Vila Seca, left at his own request in 1828
Kingdom of Portugal
J. L. Bayard		6 November 1835– 27 December 1839	
Marquês de Saldanha		8 March 1842– 3 September 1847	since 3 March 1842 Ambassador; left on 8 September 1845
Pedro de Sousa Botelho		23 March 1846– 9 November 1847	Interim-Chargé d'affaires
Luis Victorino de Noronha		10 November 1847 –10 February 1848	since 3 November 1847 Ambassador; left on 30 December 1847
Vasco Pinto de Balsemão		25 April 1849 –19 July 1852	Interim-Chargé d'affaires, since 14 April 1849 Ambassador, left on 31 July 1851
José António Soares Leal (pt)		13 December 1852 –28 April 1856	since 8 December 1852 Ambassador, left on 19 April 1855
Visconde de Seisal (pt)		?– 11 November 1855	Special Envoy; since 1 November 1855 Ambassador
Barão de Santa Quitéria (pt)		?– 23 July 1856	since 18 July 1856 Ambassador
António Lopes da Costa e Almeida, Barão de Reboredo		28 August 1856 –24 July 1858	since 22 August 1856 Ambassador; left on 30 June 1857
Henrique Teixeira de Sampaio		?– 1 May 1859	Chargé d'affaires; since 13 May 1858 Ambassador
Baron de Santa Quitéria (later Viscount)		?– 24 November 1868	second term; since 1 May 1859 Ambassador
Eduardo Wiener de Weltern (de)		?– 17 June 1869	Chargé d'affaires; since 25 November 1868 Ambassador
Visconde de Santa Quitéria		18 June 1869– 24 October 1871	third term; since 17 June 1869 Ambassador
Conde de São Miguel		14 December 1871 –29 August 1872	Interim-Chargé d'affaires; since 12 December 1871 Ambassador
João Coelho de Almeida		14 September 1872 –1 October 1879	since 29 August 1872 Ambassador, left on 14 August 1879
Visconde de Valmor		15 October 1880 –18 June 1897	since 1 October 1880 Ambassador, left on 20 May 1897
Conde de Paraty (pt)		25 September 1897 –10 December 1910	since 7 September 1897 Ambassador, left on 12 September 1910
Republic of Portugal
Eduardo Moreira Marques		?– 30 December 1910	Interim-Chargé d'affaires; since 12 September 1910 Ambassador
Frederico Suess Júnior		?– 23 June 1911	Chargé d'affaires; since 30 December 1910 Ambassador
Pedro Tovar de Lemos (pt)		28 September 1911 –5 May 1912	Chargé d'affaires; since 23 June 1911 Ambassador
Francisco de Oliveira Calheiros e Meneses		13 May 1912 –12 May 1914	since 6 May 1912 Ambassador
No relations		1914–1922	First World War
Alberto da Veiga Simões		4 April 1922 –28 July 1922	
Francisco Manuel Couceiro da Costa		19 October 1922 –21 April 1925	since 19 September 1922 Ambassador, left on 25 June 1924
Valentim Augusto da Silva		?– 27 June 1925	Chargé d'affaires; since 21 April 1925 Ambassador
Eugénio Carlos Martinez Tavares (also known as Eugénio dos Santos Tavares)		2 July 1925– 15 March 1926	since 27 June 1925 Ambassador
Alberto da Veiga Simões		30 April 1926 –8 August 1933	2nd term; since 21 April 1926 Ambassador
Henrique da Guerra Quaresma Viana		29 April 1933– 17 August 1933	Chargé d'affaires since 18 April 1933 Ambassador
José da Costa Carneiro		23 May 1934 –?	since 20 April 1934 Ambassador, however, not on-site; the embassy was closed
no relations		193? –1954	Austria part of the Third Reich and the consequences of the Second World War
Miguel de Almeida Paile		20 December 1954 –3 November 1958	since 15 December 1954 Ambassador, left on 12 May 1958
Marcus de Fontes Pereira de Melo Fonseca		?– 11 October 1959	Interim-Chargé d'affaires; since 12 May 1958 Ambassador
Abílio Andrade Pinto de Lemos		19 October 1959 –27 October 1962	since 11 October 1959 Ambassador
António de Lucena		?– 2 March 1963	Chargé d'affaires; since 2 October 1962 Ambassador
Marcus de Fontes Pereira de Melo Fonseca		18 March 1963 –12 June 1965	second term; since 3 March 1963 Ambassador
Manuel de Sá Nogueira		?– 1 September 1965	Chargé d'affaires; since 12 June 1965 Ambassador
Aramando Ramos de Paula Coelho		27 September 1967 –31 January 1969	since 1 September 1967 Ambassador
Guilherme Margarido de Castilho		19 February 1969 –26 June 1975	since 3 February 1969 Ambassador
Eduardo Augusto Andrade Braga Condé		2 July 1975– 26 June 1976	since 30 June 1975 Ambassador
Sérgio Alexandre Aires Trindade Sacadura Cabral		14 July 1976– 12 September 1979	since 1 July 1976 Ambassador
António Luís de Magalhães de Abreu Novais Machado		10 October 1979 –19 January 1981	since 28 September 1979 Ambassador
José Moreira de Campos Alves		?– 13 July 1981	Chargé d'affaires; since 10 February 1981 Ambassador
Tomás de Mello Breyner Andresen (de)		15 July 1981– 31 December 1983	since 13 July 1981 Ambassador
Sebastião Maria de Almeida Castelo-Branco		?– 8 October 1984	Chargé d'affaires; since 31 December 1983 Ambassador
António Augusto de Medeiros Patrício		15 October 1984 –7 April 1986	since 9 October 1984 Ambassador
Carlos Macieira Ary dos Santos		26 September 1986 –20 January 1993	since 5 August 1986 Ambassador
Octávio Neto Valério (de)		17 February 1993 –23 October 1995	
Álvaro José Costa de Mendonça e Moura		7 December 1995 –14 June 1999	since 4 December 1995 Ambassador
João da Rosa Lã (de)		18 June 1999– 24 January 2001	since 13 June 1999 Ambassador
Carlos Neves Ferreira		?– 17 February 2005	since 16 November 2001 Ambassador
António Luiz da Silva Sennfelt		?– 5 February 2006	since 18 March 2005 Ambassador
Vasco Luís Pereira Bramão Ramos		?– 1 November 2006	since 23 February 2006 Ambassador
Joaquim Rafael Caimoto Duarte		?– 23 October 2009	since 11 April 2007 Ambassador
Ana Maria da Silva Marques Martinho		28 March 2012 –13 March 2013	since 1 March 2012 Ambassador
Pedro Moitinho de Almeida (de)		5 April 2013- 7 April 2017	
António Carlos Carvalho de Almeida Ribeiro		12 September 2017- 21 March 2022	
Miguel Maria Simões Coelho de Almeida e Sousa		22 March 2022- 6 August 2025	
Jorge Silva Lopes		since 6 August 2025	

== See also ==
- List of ambassadors of Austria to Portugal
- Foreign relations of Portugal
- Foreign relations of Austria
