= Battle of Rio de Janeiro (1710) =

1710 naval battle

Coordinates: 22.9098°S 43.1763°W

- Part of the War of the Spanish Succession
Date	19 September 1710
Location	Rio de Janeiro, State of Brazil
Result	Portuguese victory

Belligerents
(Portugal) Portuguese Empire: State of Brazil	France

Commanders and leaders
Francisco de Castro	Jean Duclerc (POW)

Strength
15,000 troops and militia	6 ships 1,500 men

Casualties and losses
270 killed and wounded	600 killed 600 captured

The 1710 Battle of Rio de Janeiro was a failed raid by a French privateering fleet on the Portuguese colonial city of Rio de Janeiro in August 1710, during the War of the Spanish Succession. The raid was a complete failure; its commander, Jean-François Duclerc, and more than 600 men were captured. French anger over the Portuguese failure to properly hold, release, or exchange the prisoners contributed to a second, successful raid, the following year.

Duclerc was killed while in Portuguese captivity on 18 March 1711; his killers (and their reason for killing him) are unknown.

== See also ==
- Portugal in the War of Spanish Succession
