= Dominica–France relations =

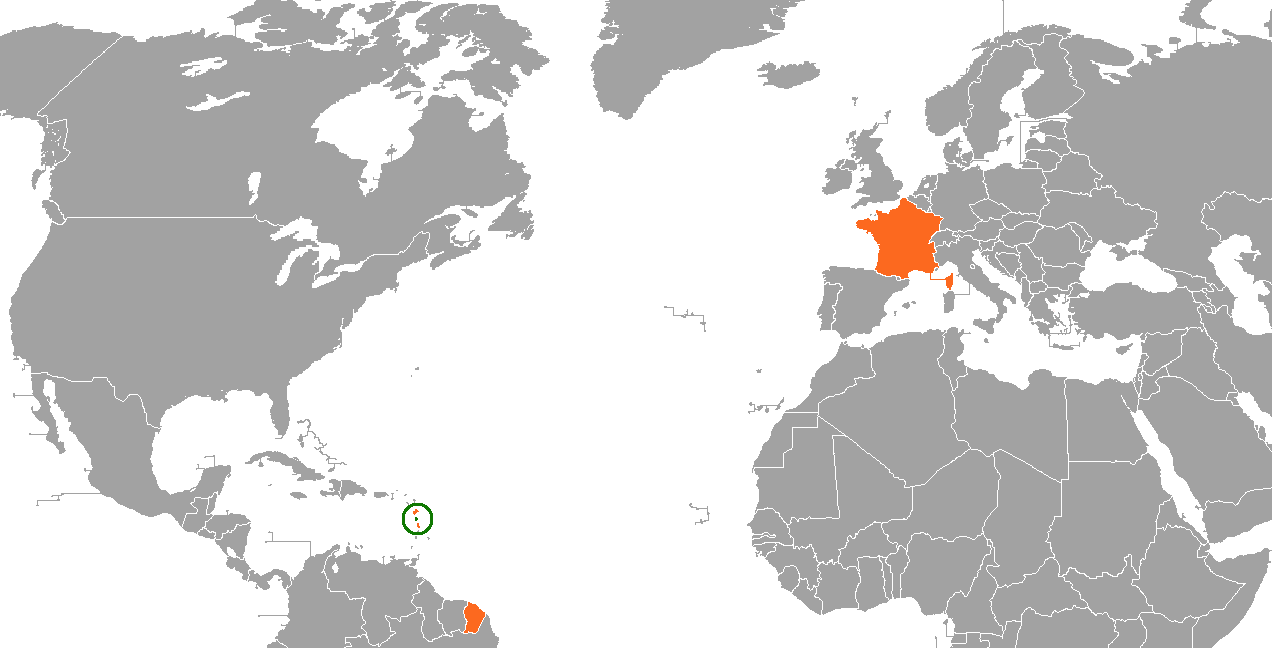

- Dominica: France

The Commonwealth of Dominica and the Republic of France maintain historical, political, economic, social and cultural relations. Sometimes referred to as "French Dominique" (to distinguish it from the Dominican Republic, and pay homage to Dominica's historic French-speaking roots), Dominica also shares close ties with its nearest neighbours, the overseas departments of the French Republic, Guadeloupe to the north and Martinique to the south. At present, Dominica is connected to the French islands by an inter-island express ferry. Under the auspice of the European Union both Dominica and France are tied economically via a 2008 concluded multilateral Economic Partnership Agreement (EPA) trade-deal representing many Caribbean nations under the name CARIFORUM. They are further members of: The Association of Caribbean States (ACS), the Caribbean Postal Union, the Organisation internationale de la Francophonie, the International Monetary Fund (IMF), the World Bank, and the United Nations.

== History ==
Relations between Dominica and France date back to 1600-1700s leading up to when Dominica became a French colony. Both nations have concluded a maritime boundary agreement in 1987.

In 2015, Martinique joined the Organisation of Eastern Caribbean States (OECS), of which the Commonwealth of Dominica is a founding member. In 2019, Guadeloupe acquired associate member status, and Collectivity of Saint Martin was admitted as an observer member.

The French embassy for Dominica and the Organisation of Eastern Caribbean States + Barbados is located in Castries, Saint Lucia, while Dominica maintains non-resident embassy in London to France.

The Roseau Alliance Française branch maintains an office close to the heart of Dominica's capital-city Roseau.

It is estimated that roughly 3500 nationals from Dominique reside in France, with roughly 120 French nationals in Dominique.

== See also ==
- Compagnie des Îles de l'Amérique
- Dominican Creole French
- French Antilles
- French colonial empire
- List of colonial governors and administrators of Dominica
- Category:Dominica expatriates in France
- Category:French expatriates in Dominica
