= Luís António de Sousa Botelho Mourão =

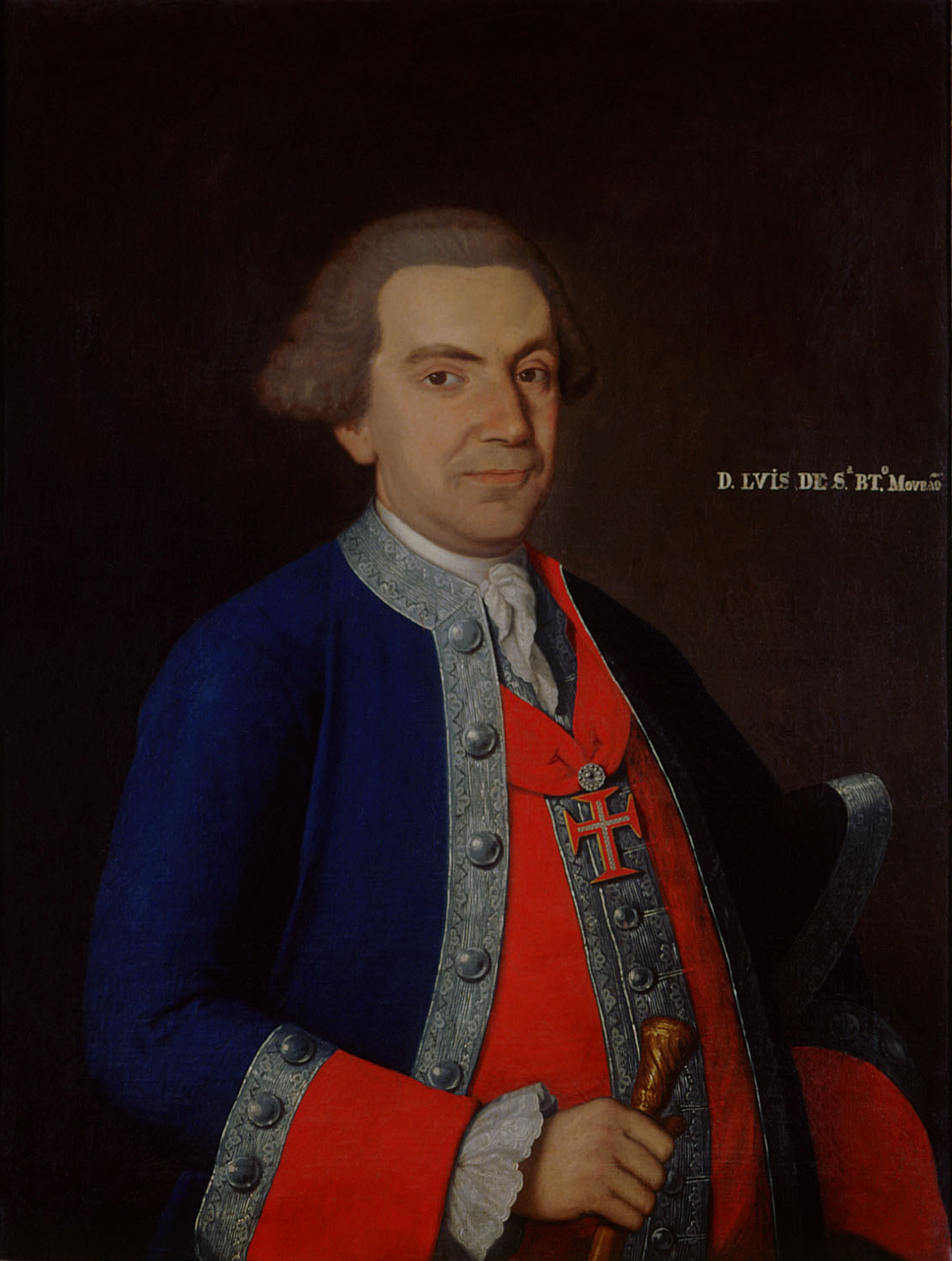

Dom Luís António de Sousa Botelho Mourão, 4th Morgado de Mateus (21 February 1722 – 5 October 1798), was a Portuguese noble, after the restoration of São Paulo autonomy, he became the first Captain general of the Captaincy of São Paulo, in 1765, seventeen years after being subordinate to Rio de Janeiro.
