= Jean-François Duclerc =

- Born: 1660; Guadeloupe
- Died: 18 March 1711 (aged 50–51); Rio de Janeiro, Brazil
- Cause of death: Homicide
- Occupation: Privateer
- Known for: Victim of unsolved murder

Jean-François Duclerc (Guadeloupe, 16?? – Rio de Janeiro, 18 March 1711) was a French privateer, and appointed Knight of the Order of Saint-Louis.

== Background ==
He was born in Guadeloupe as son of Jean Duclerc. He started a career in the French Navy, first as captain of a fireship and then in command of a frigate. On 10 May 1710, he sailed from La Rochelle as commander of a small fleet to attack Rio de Janeiro. He had only six ships and 1,200 men at his disposal. At the end of August 1710, they reached Rio and tried to conquer the city. The raid was a disaster.

The Portuguese were notified of their arrival and had no difficulties in crushing the small force. 400 French were killed and 700 captured, including Duclerc. Despite the failure, Duclerc was appointed Knight of the Order of Saint-Louis. On 18 March 1711, Duclerc was assassinated in prison in mysterious circumstances by a group of masked men. In September 1711, a much larger French force under Duguay-Trouin did succeed in conquering Rio de Janeiro and freeing the surviving prisoners from Duclerc's raid.

== See also ==
- List of unsolved murders (before 1900)

== Sources ==
- Biographic data (French)
- French attacks on Brasil (Portuguese)
