= José Maria de Sousa =

Portuguese diplomat (1758–1825)

Dom José Maria de Sousa Knight of the Order of Christ
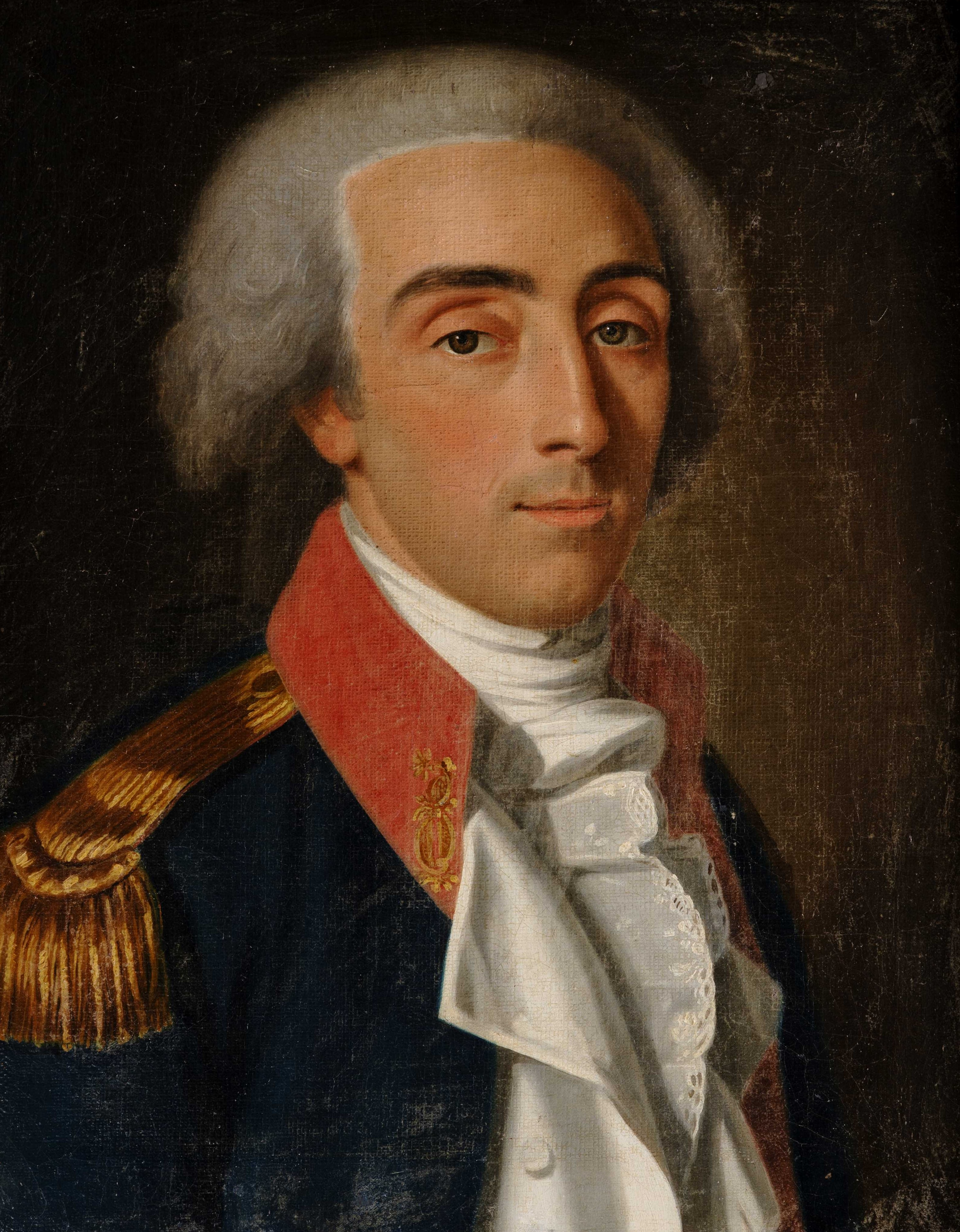

Envoy Extraordinary and Minister Plenipotentiary of Portugal
- In office 1791–1805
- Monarch: Maria I of Portugal

Alcaide-mor of Bragança
- Incumbent
- Assumed office 28 May 1789

Personal details
- Born: José Maria do Carmo de Sousa Botelho Mourão e Vasconcelos; 9 March 1758 Porto, Portugal
- Died: 1 June 1825 (aged 67) Paris, France
- Children: José Luís de Sousa Botelho Mourão e Vasconcelos
- Parents: Luís António de Sousa Botelho Mourão (father); D. Leonor of Portugal (mother)
- Education: University of Coimbra
- Occupation: Editor, diplomat, military officer
- Known for: Editor of Os Lusíadas

Dom José Maria do Carmo de Sousa Botelho Mourão e Vasconcelos, Morgado de Mateus (9 March 1758 – 1 June 1825), was a Portuguese noble, editor, diplomat, and military officer. He was the son of D. Luís António de Sousa Botelho Mourão, 4th Morgado of Mateus and Governor and Captain-General of São Paulo, and D. Leonor of Portugal.
