= Economic partnership agreement =

An economic partnership agreement is an economic arrangement that eliminates barriers to the free movement of goods, services, and investment between countries. This agreement can be considered an intermediate step between free trade area and single market in the process of economic integration. Economic partnerships are sometimes described as high standard variants of free trade agreements.

One example is the Japan-Mexico Economic Partnership Agreement.

== See also ==
- Trans-Pacific Strategic Economic Partnership Agreement
