= France–Portugal relations =

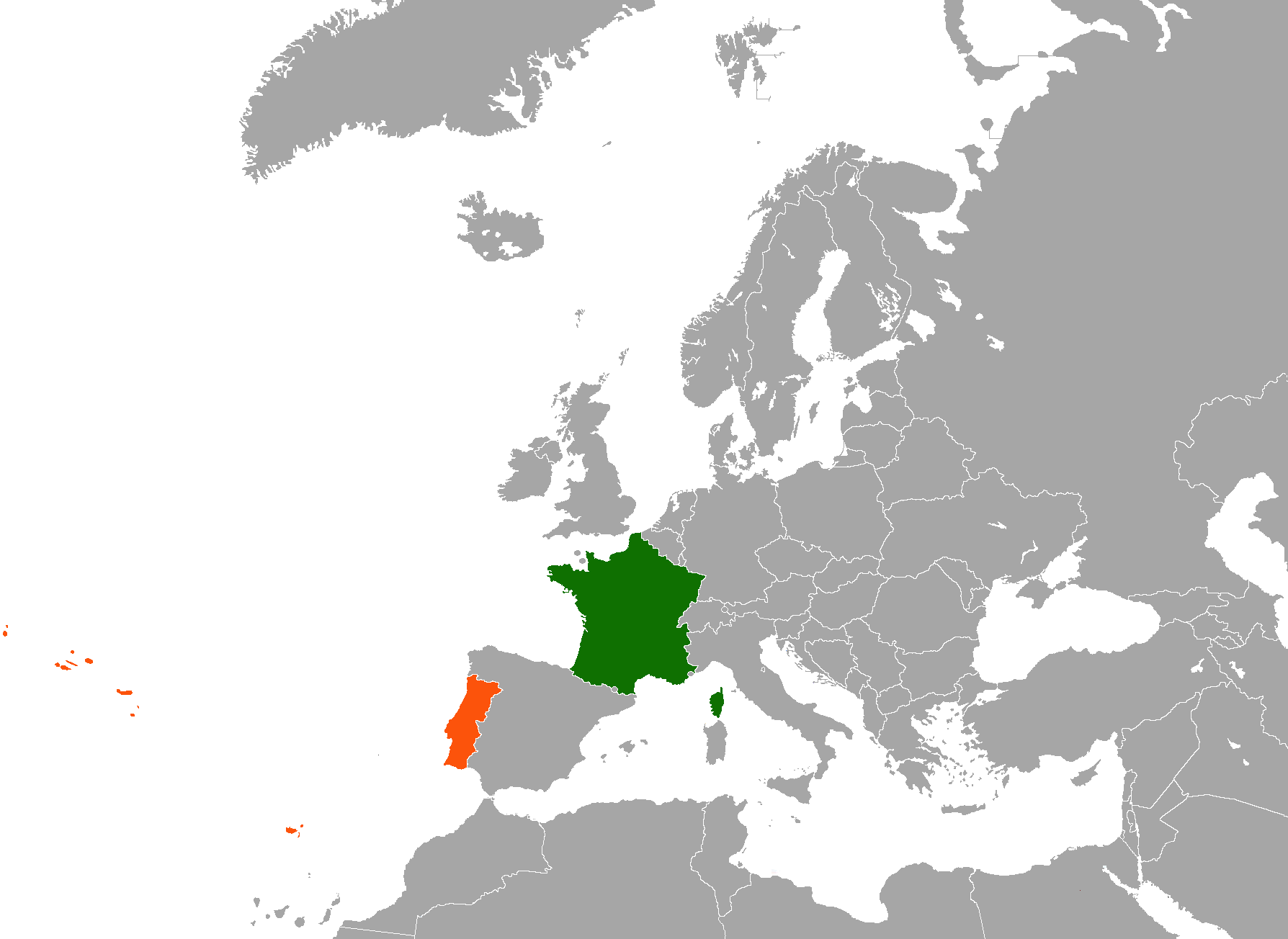
- France: Portugal

Diplomatic mission
- Embassy of France, Lisbon: Embassy of Portugal, Paris

France and Portugal have maintained historical and current relations. Both nations are members of the Council of Europe, European Union, NATO, Organisation for Economic Co-operation and Development, Union for the Mediterranean and the United Nations.

== History ==
France and Portugal have a long history of relations given the proximity between both nations. Afonso I of Portugal, the founding monarch of the Kingdom of Portugal, was an agnatic descendant of the French House of Burgundy, itself a cadet branch of the influential Capetian dynasty. Both nations would become two of the largest global empires, with both the French colonial empire and the Portuguese Empire competing against each other in their quest to expand their respective empires. In 1482, the Portuguese navigator and explorer Diogo Cão discovered the mouth of the Congo River in Central Africa, he became the first European to encounter the Kingdom of Kongo with Manikongo, the most powerful ruler of Africa. In 1495, France and Portugal signed a Treaty of Alliance and Trade, the first between both nations. In 1536, another Treaty of Friendship and Alliance was signed between the countries.

Between 1640 and 1668, France sided with Portugal during the Portuguese Restoration War against Spain. However, during the Seven Years' War, both nations were on opposing sides during the conflict. Both France and Portugal were on opposing sides during the War of the Spanish Succession and again during the Spanish invasion of Portugal of 1762. In 1641, the first Portuguese embassy was sent to France.

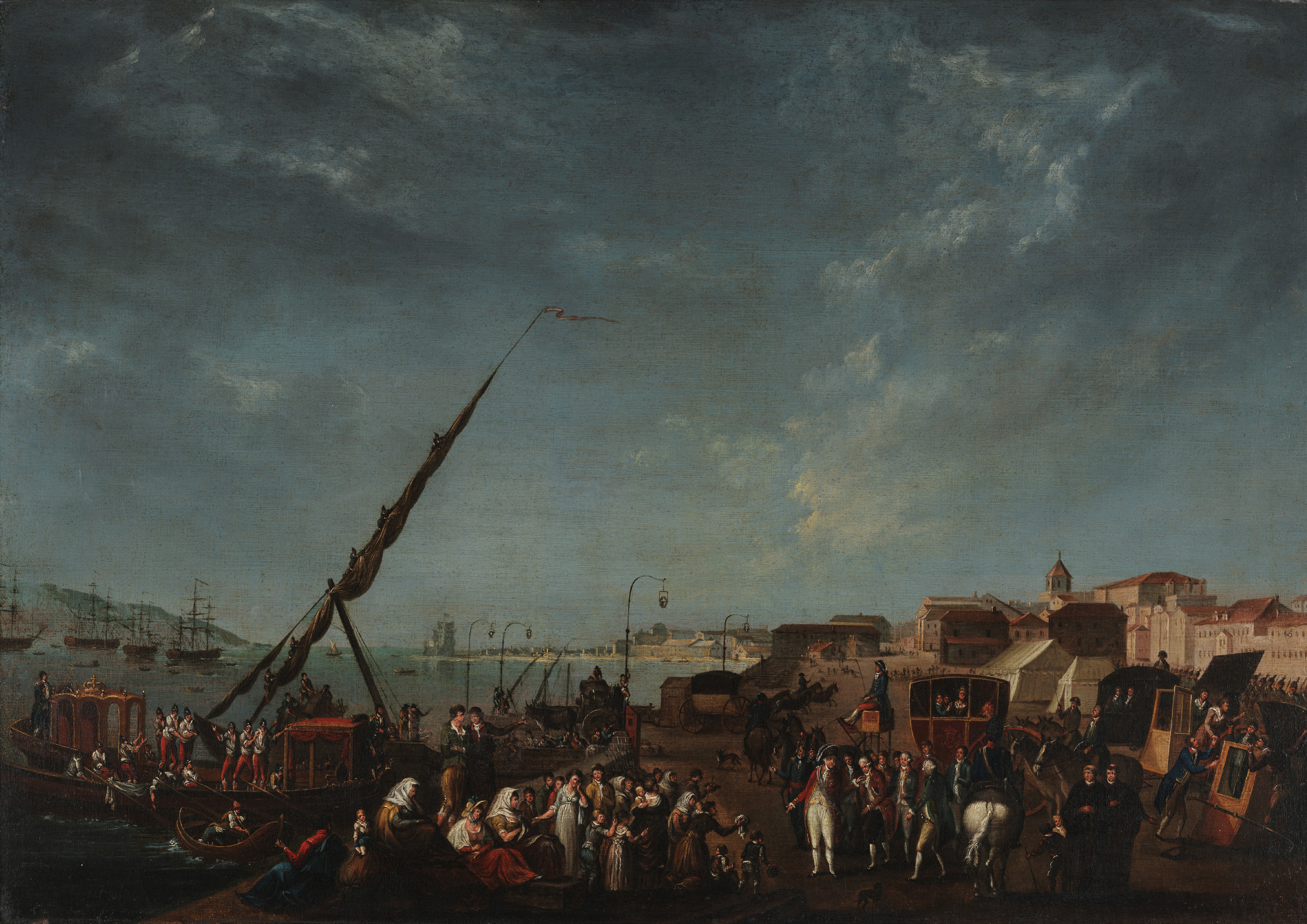
The transfer of the Portuguese court to Brazil on 27 November 1807

Relations between France and Portugal came to its lowest point when in 1807, Portugal refused French Emperor Napoleon's demand to accede to the Continental System of embargo against the United Kingdom. Soon afterwards, a French invasion under General Jean-Andoche Junot followed, and the Portuguese capital of Lisbon was captured on 8 December 1807, though Portuguese resistance continued. As a result of the impending French invasion, the Portuguese monarchy transferred its court to Rio de Janeiro in Brazil. Rio de Janeiro would remain the capital of Portugal and the empire between 1808 and 1821. Lisbon regained its status as the capital of Portugal when Brazil declared its independence from Portugal in 1822.

British intervention in the Peninsular War helped in maintaining Portuguese independence; the last French troops were expelled in defeat in 1812. The war cost Portugal the town of Olivença, which is now governed by Spain.

During the 20th century, Portugal and France would forge closer political ties, with France gaining a greater relevance in Portuguese foreign policy issues. During World War I, Portugal remained neutral, however, in 1916 it became an associated member to the Allied forces (which included France). During World War II, although Portugal officially remained neutral, Portuguese diplomat Aristides de Sousa Mendes, stationed in Nazi-occupied France, defied government orders and issued thousands of visas, helping refugees — many of them Jewish—escape to Portugal and safety.

Between the 1950s and 1970s, nearly a million Portuguese emigrated to France to escape the Estado Novo regime and poverty. Relations between France and Portugal remain close. Both nations are members of the European Union and work closely together on numerous issues.

== Diaspora ==
France is host to the largest Portuguese diaspora community in Europe with approximately 1.7 million Portuguese citizens living in France, and making Portugal the largest foreign community in France. Meanwhile, 27,512 French citizens are living in Portugal in 2022.

== High-level Visits ==
=== France to Portugal ===
Year	Name
1978	President Valéry Giscard d'Estaing visited Portugal.
1987	President François Mitterrand visited Portugal.
1999	President Jacques Chirac visited Portugal.
2016	President François Hollande visited Portugal, where he was received in the Belém Palace by President Marcelo Rebelo de Sousa, with whom he held a meeting.
2021	Sophie Cluzel, Minister of State for Disabled People, visited Portugal for the European Week for the Employment of People with Disabilities. Olivier Dussopt, Minister Delegate for Public Accounts, travelled to Portugal as part of preparations for the French Presidency of the Council of the European Union.
2022	The French Minister of Culture, Roselyne Bachelot Narquin, visited Lisbon. President Emmanuel Macron and the Minister for Europe and Foreign Affairs, Catherine Colonna, visited Lisbon for the United Nations Ocean Conference. Prime Minister Élisabeth Borne made an official visit to Lisbon for the closure of the France-Portugal Season accompanied by the Minister for Europe and Foreign Affairs and the Minister of Culture.

=== Portugal to France ===
Year	Name
1917	President Bernardino Machado visited France, where he inspected the troops of the Portuguese Expeditionary Corps.
1975	President Francisco da Costa Gomes visited France.
1979	President António Ramalho Eanes visited France.
1984	President António Ramalho Eanes visited the Council of Europe in Strasbourg, France.
1986	President Mário Soares visited France, where he visited the cities of Paris and Strasbourg and gave a speech in the European Parliament.
1989	President Mário Soares visited Paris for the 2nd centenary of the French Revolution, following an invitation from his French Counterpart.
1994	President Mário Soares visited Bordeaux, where he inaugurated a bust in homage to Aristides Sousa Mendes, as well as a plaque that marks the building where the Portuguese Consulate was located at the time.
1996	President Jorge Sampaio visited the Council of Europe in Strasbourg for the 10th anniversary of the accession of Portugal. President Jorge Sampaio visited France, where he met with members of the Portuguese Community in the Region of Paris, and visited the headquarters of UNESCO.
1998	President Jorge Sampaio visited Paris for the commemorations of the 5th centenary of the Voyage of Vasco da Gama to India. President Jorge Sampaio visited Strasbourg, where he visited the European Court of Human Rights.
2000	President Jorge Sampaio visited Bordeaux for the inauguration of the "Carrefour des Littératures".
2001	President Jorge Sampaio visited Paris.
2002	President Jorge Sampaio visited Paris.
2004	President Jorge Sampaio visited Paris for the Founding Congress of United Cities and Local Governments.
2005	President Jorge Sampaio visited France.
2015	President Aníbal Cavaco Silva visited Paris, where he visited the headquarters of the OECD.
2016	President Marcelo Rebelo de Sousa visited Paris for the commemorations of the Day of Portugal, Camões and the Portuguese Communities.
2018	President Marcelo Rebelo de Sousa visited France for the Commemorations of the Centenary of the Battle of La Lys. President Marcelo Rebelo de Sousa visited France for the Commemorations of the Centenary of the Armistice of the First World War.
2022	President Marcelo Rebelo de Sousa, Prime Minister, António Costa, and Minister of Maritime Affairs, Ricardo Serrão Santos visited France to participate in the One Ocean Summit in Brest, and in the opening ceremony of the Portugal-France Season 2022, in Paris. President Emmanuel Macron received the Portuguese Prime Minister, António Costa, in Paris. The Minister of State for Europe, Laurence Boone, met with her Portuguese counterpart, Tiago Antunes, in Paris. Minister of Foreign Affairs, João Cravinho, visited Paris during the France-Portugal Season, where he was received by Minister for Europe and Foreign Affairs Catherine Colonna.

== Economic relations ==
In 2021, trade in goods between the two countries amounted to 13.8 billion euros (corresponding to 8.3 billion euros in exports and 5.5 billion euros in imports). In 2021, France consolidated its position as the second destination for Portuguese exports (13.1% of the total), which from the previous year alone grew by €1 billion. More than 5,400 Portuguese companies exported to the country.

In terms of investment, France was the first foreign investor in Portugal in 2021, and the fourth in terms of accumulated stock, with more than €13 billion. Between 2016 and 2020, French investment in Portugal grew by 86%. Around 750 French companies are established in Portugal, with their subsidiaries creating the most added value in the country.

In the tourism sector, France was in 2021 Portugal's second largest market in terms of guests, third in terms of overnight stays and first in terms of revenue (€1.7 billion).

Being an area particularly affected by the pandemic, the tourism sector showed a strong recovery after 2020, with a growth of 60.9% in the number of guests and 61.3% in French overnight stay values. In 2019, before the pandemic, there were 1,623,200 French guests, a number which fell to 725,100 in 2021.

== Resident diplomatic missions ==
- France has an embassy in Lisbon.
- Portugal has an embassy in Paris, consulates-general in Bordeaux, Lyon, Marseille, Strasbourg, and a vice-consulate in Toulouse.
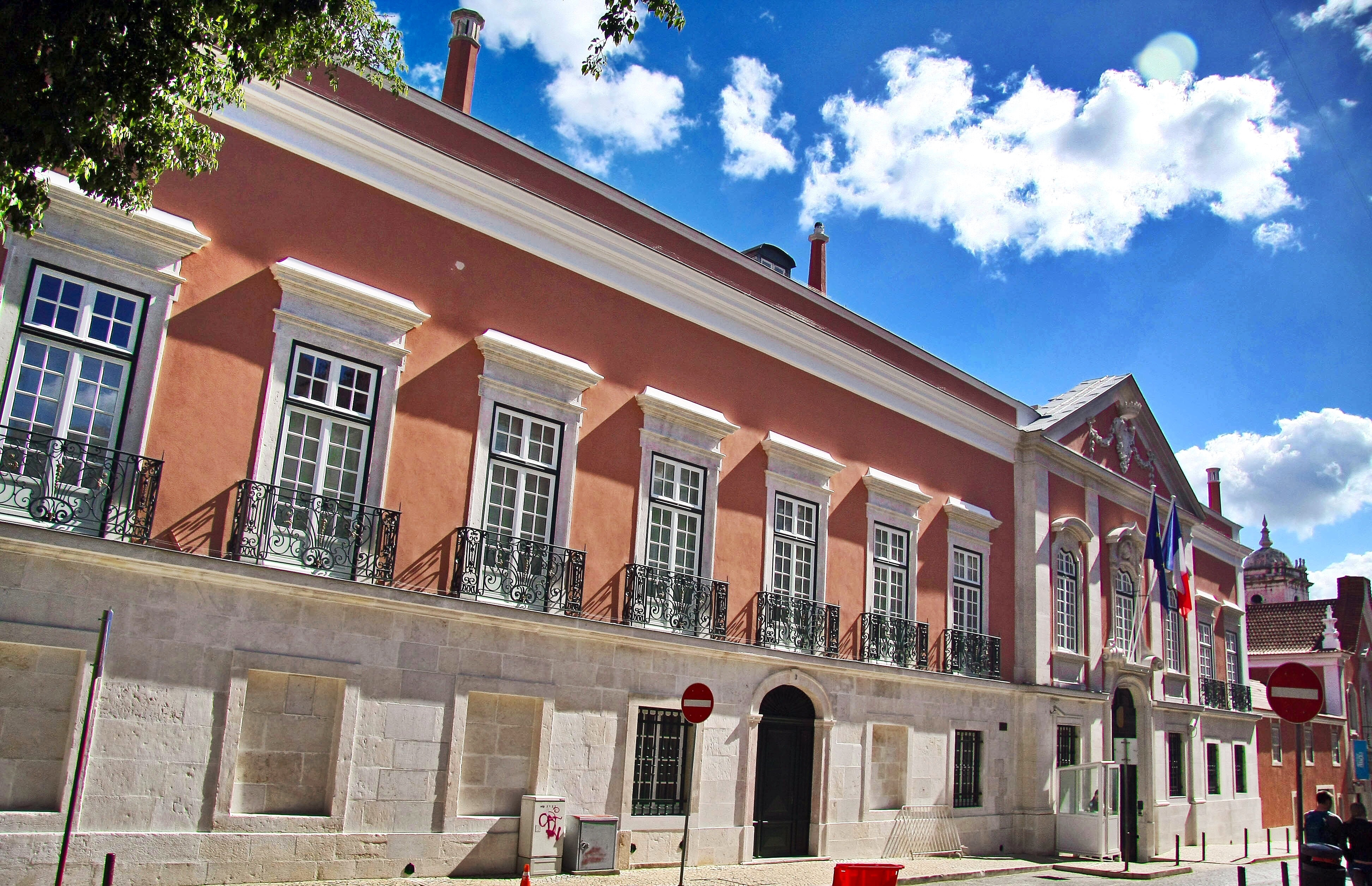
Embassy of France in Lisbon

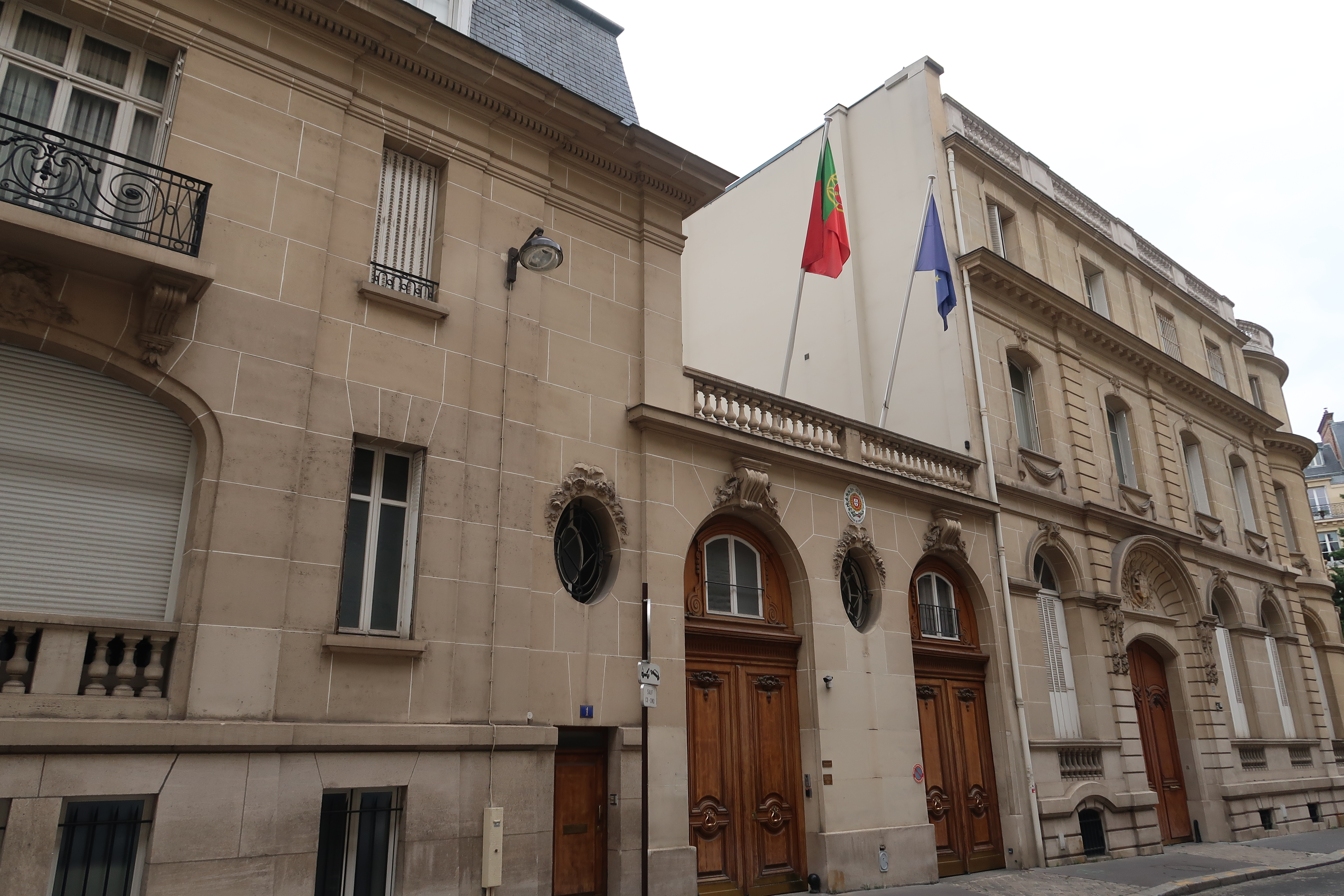
Embassy of Portugal in Paris

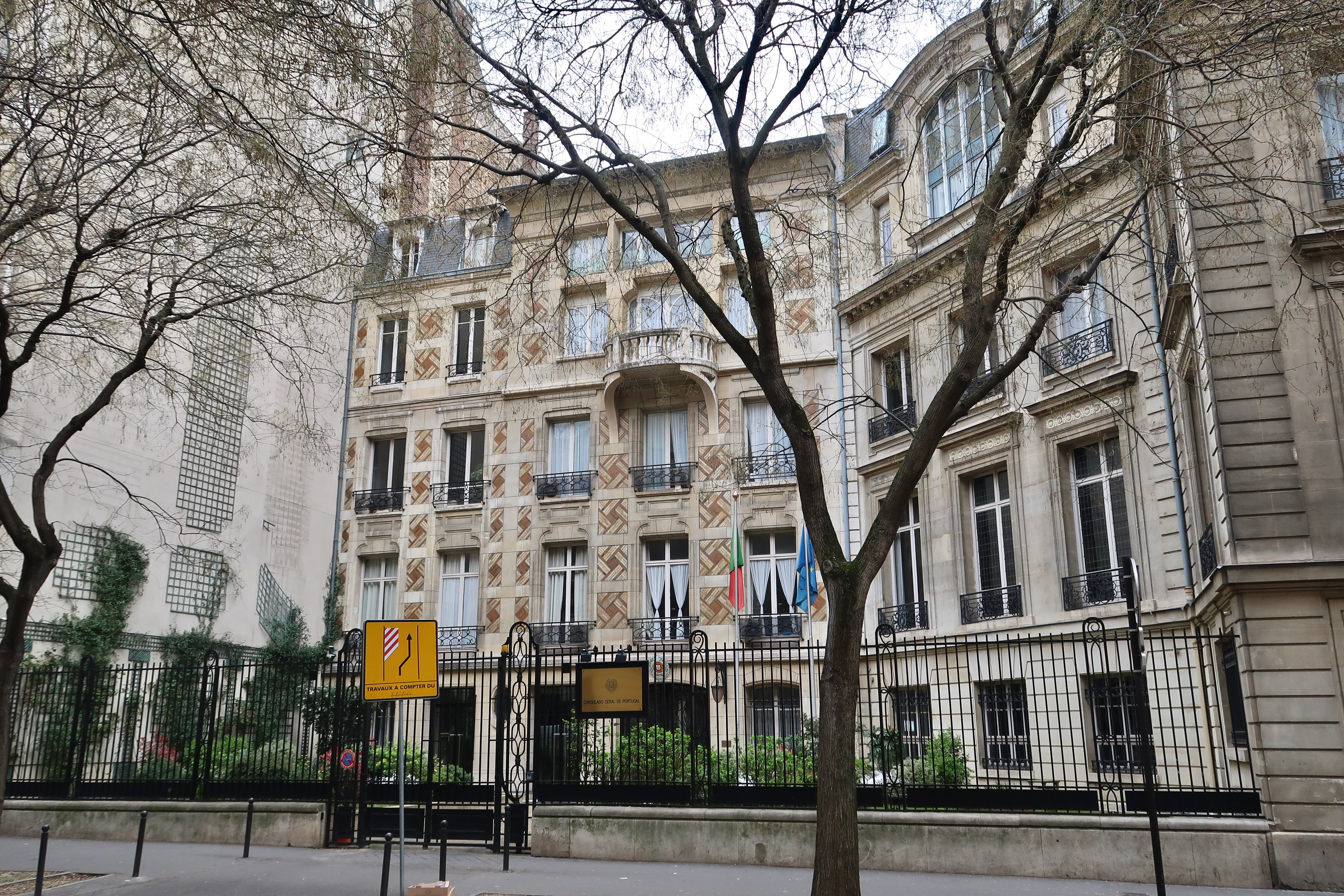
Consulate-General of Portugal in Paris

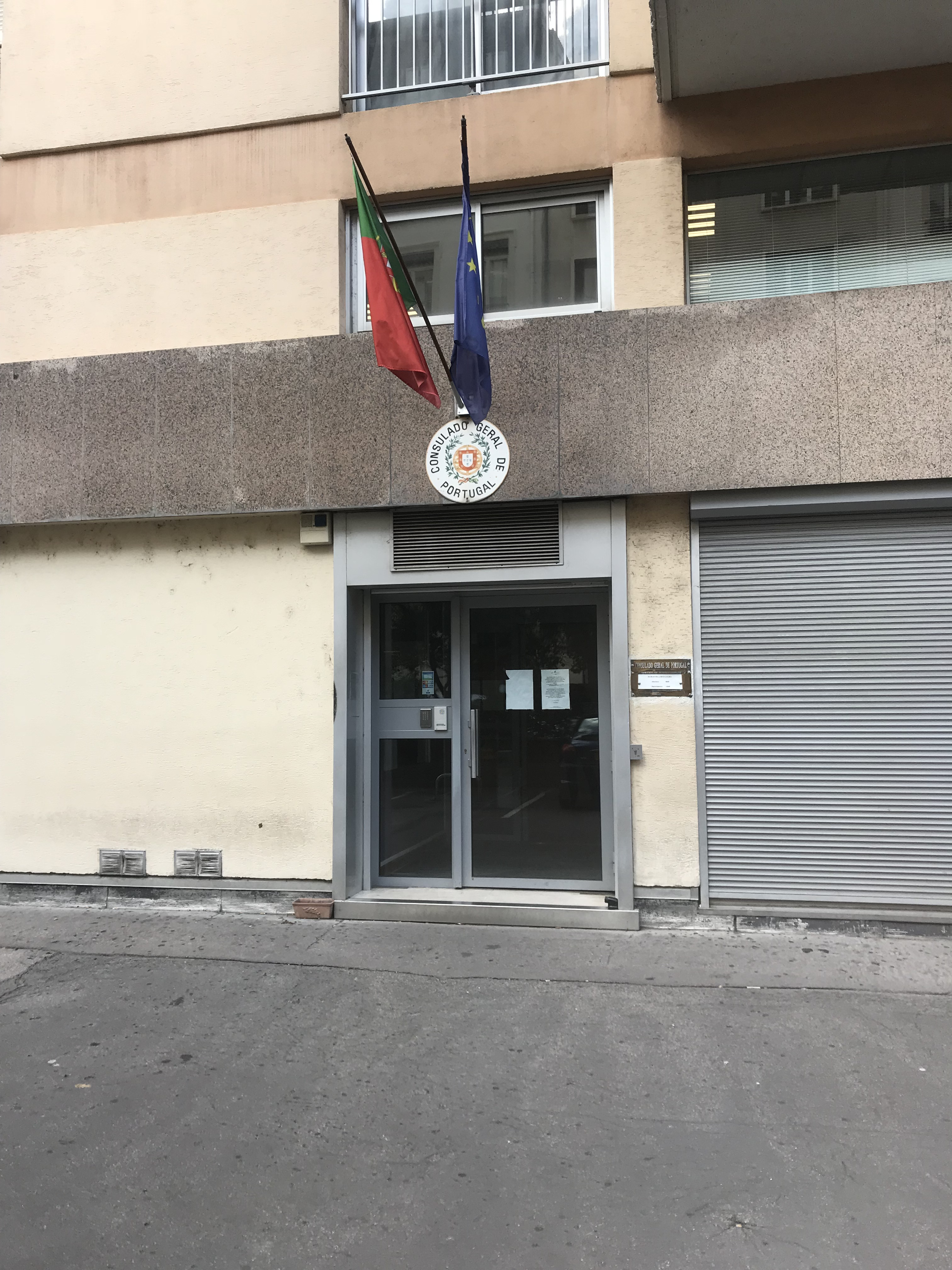
Consulate-General of Portugal in Lyon

== See also ==
- Portuguese in France
