= Treaty of Aranjuez (1779) =

1779 treaty between France and Spain

Treaty of Alliance between Spain and France
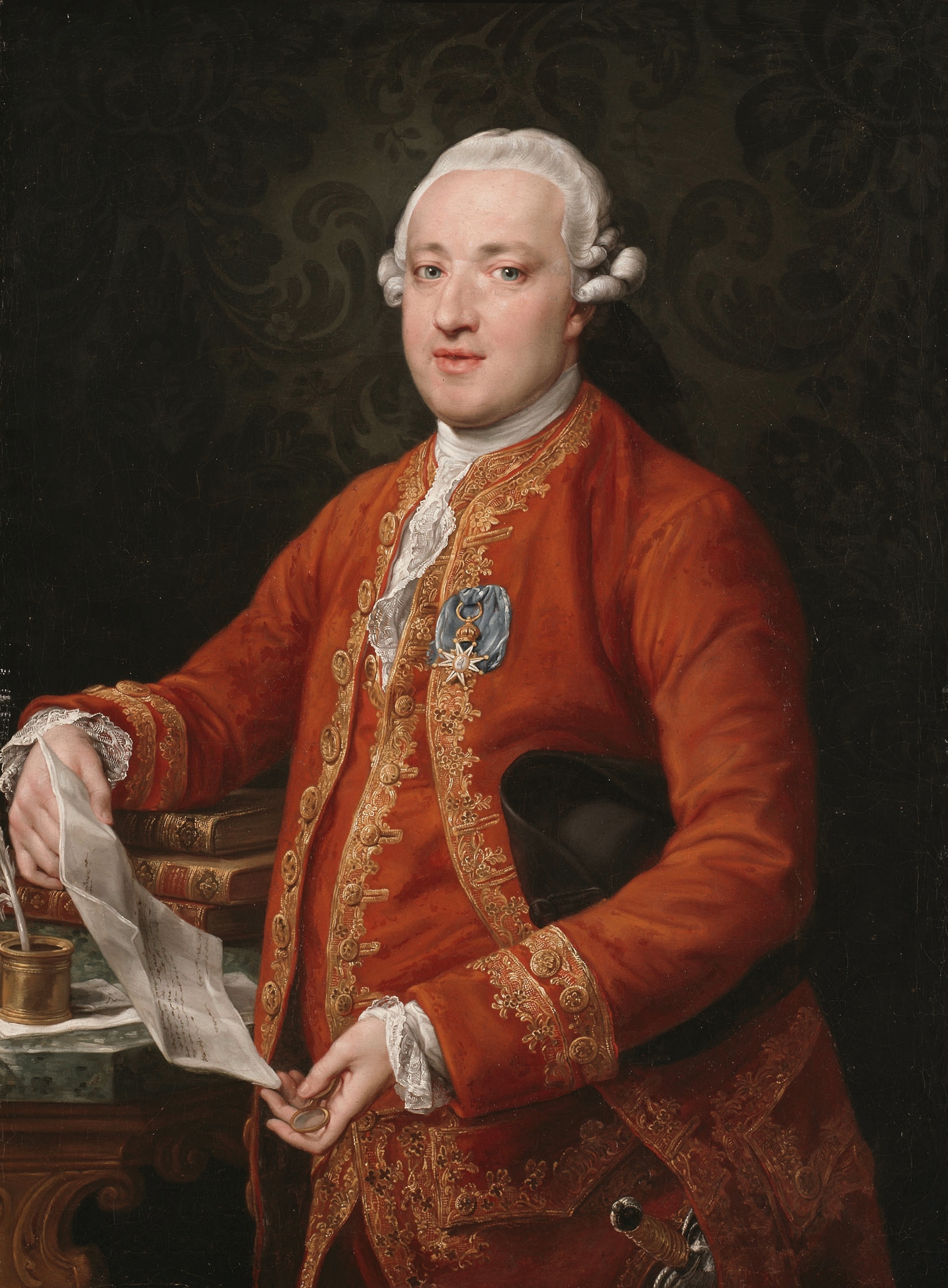
- Conde de Floridablanca, Chief Minister of Spain 1777–1792
- Context: Spain begins Anglo-Spanish War (1779–1783) by joining the Anglo-French War (1778–1783)
- Signed: 12 April 1779
- Location: Aranjuez, Spain
- Negotiators: (Kingdom of France) Comte de Vergennes; (Spain) Count of Floridablanca
- Parties: France; Spain

In the Treaty of Aranjuez (French: Traité d'Aranjuez; Spanish: Tratado de Aranjuez; 12 April 1779), Spain agreed to support France in its war with Britain. This was in return for assistance in recovering its former possessions of Menorca, Gibraltar, and Spanish Florida.

While Spain refused to become formally involved in the American Revolutionary War, they allowed goods to be shipped through Louisiana, avoiding the British blockade while their recapture of Florida denied the Royal Navy bases on the Gulf Coast. Outside North America, they regained Menorca but failed to take Gibraltar, despite a huge investment of men and money.

With the exception of Menorca and Florida, the 1783 treaties between Britain, France, and Spain largely returned the position to that prevailing before the Anglo-Spanish War (1779–1783).

== Background ==
Under the 1713 Treaty of Utrecht, Spain ceded Menorca and Gibraltar to Britain and regaining them became a primary objective. Beginning in 1733, Spain and France had made a series of agreements, Pacte de Famille, that lead to cooperation and military alliance on a defined basis. During the Seven Years' War in 1756, Spain was allied with France; they re-captured Menorca but lost Havana and Manila in 1762. As part of the Treaty of Paris (1763) that ended the war, Britain exchanged these for Spanish Florida, while France compensated Spain by transferring ownership of Louisiana (see Map). British West Florida was strategically important, since it controlled entry to the Mississippi River through the port of Mobile and included the modern Gulf Coast of the United States.

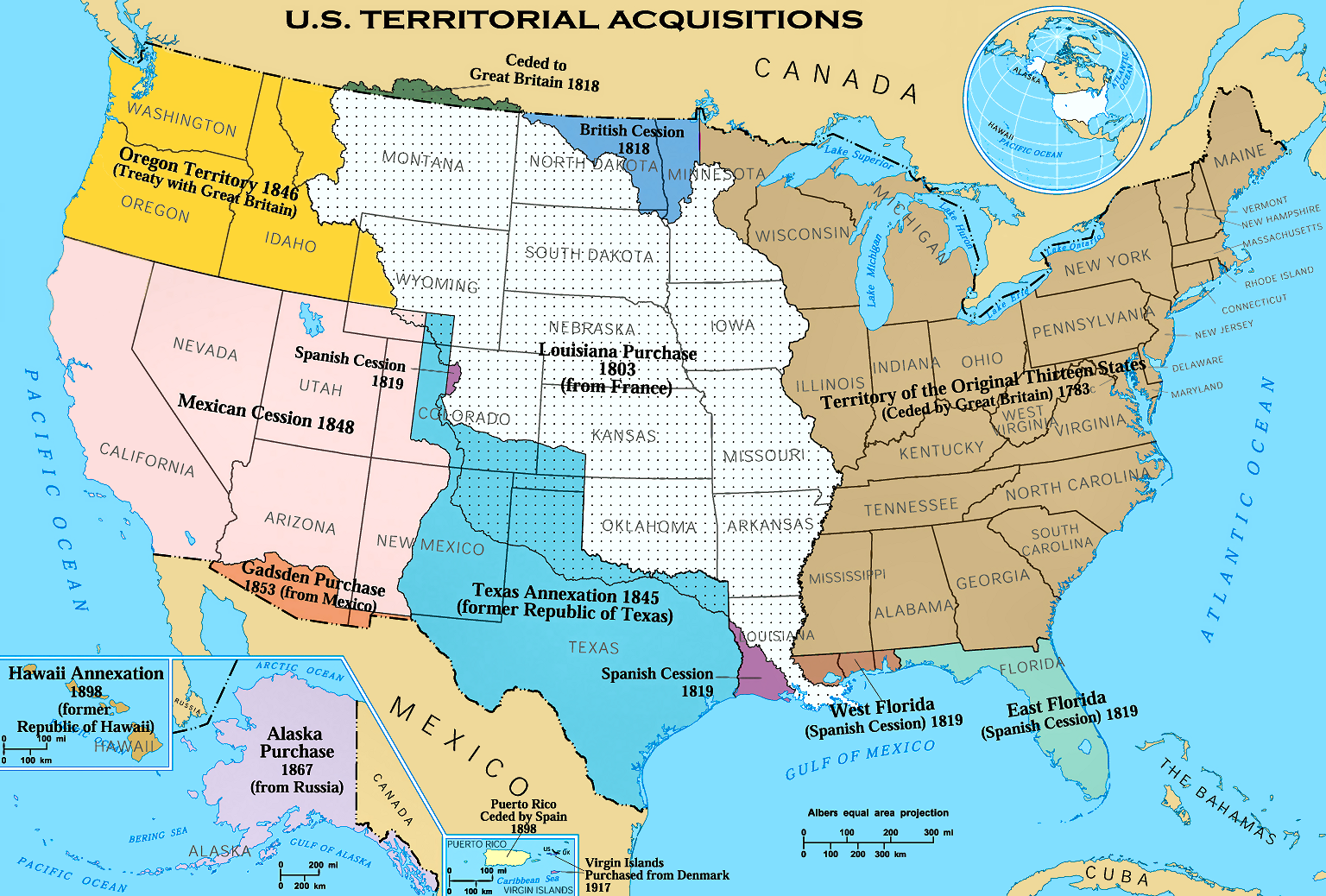
North America, 1774; New Spain (white), West Florida and East Florida (green), ceded to Britain in 1763

When the American Revolutionary War began in 1776, the British blockade of New England meant Spanish ports such as New Orleans and Havana became a vital supply route for the colonists. This support was provided unofficially since Spain's Chief Minister, Count Floridablanca, hoped diplomacy would persuade Britain to return Menorca, Gibraltar and the Floridas and remove illegal settlements in Central America. Peace with Britain was viewed as essential for his domestic reforms, while Spanish colonies in the Americas or New Spain were vulnerable to British naval power. This concern was heightened by border disputes with Britain's ally Portugal over the Rio de la Plata basin.

The two countries fought several minor wars over this issue but unlike previous conflicts, commitments elsewhere meant Britain was unable to help Portugal, which remained neutral during the American Revolutionary War as a result. The Spanish–Portuguese War (1776–77) was settled by the October 1777 First Treaty of San Ildefonso; in the Treaty of El Pardo (1778) Portugal agreed not to allow its ports in the Americas to be used by nations hostile to Spain, a measure aimed at Britain.

In February 1778, France and the United States signed a Treaty of Alliance, in which France recognised US independence and provided military support. The American War now became part of a wider, global conflict, undermining efforts to reach a diplomatic solution with Britain. On 12 April 1779, France and Spain signed the Treaty of Aranjuez. As it was seen as a renewal of the third Pacte de Famille, this was not known as the fourth Pacte de Famille.

== Provisions ==
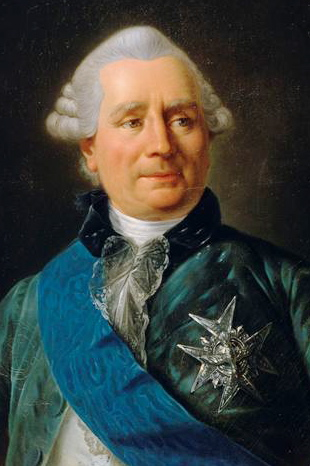
Comte de Vergennes, French Foreign Minister 1774-1781

Spain agreed to support French demands for a range of commercial concessions attempting to roll back British gains made at Utrecht in 1713. Many of the terms were kept secret, including granting France exclusive control over the Newfoundland fishing grounds, a provision unacceptable to the Americans. In return, France would assist in recovering Gibraltar, Menorca and Florida.

Spain would only agree to attack British possessions beyond the United States and would only tacitly recognise US independence in 1783 during the Peace of Paris. One reason for their reluctance to intervene directly was that Charles III and Floridablanca were concerned by the potential impact of the American Revolution on Spain's own colonies, which they considered essential for modernising and expanding the Spanish economy. In addition, there had been constant disputes over encroachment by American colonists into New Spain before the war; once the United States replaced Britain, future conflict was inevitable.

Another less well-known impact of the Treaty was a deep and abiding Congressional mistrust of "foreign entanglements" which arguably remains current. France agreed in a secret clause to continue the war until Spain recovered Gibraltar, while the 1778 Franco-American Treaty committed the signatories not to make a separate peace. The combination effectively tied US independence to Spain's recovery of Gibraltar, without the knowledge of the Continental Congress.

== Aftermath ==
Spain formally declared war on Britain on 21 June, thus beginning the Anglo-Spanish War (1779–1783). In February 1782, Menorca fell to a combined French and Spanish fleet and with the capture of the Floridas, these constituted significant successes for Spain. However, the largest effort was devoted to the Great Siege of Gibraltar which after three years had made little progress despite enormous expenditures of both money and men. The imposition of heavy taxes and 'voluntary' donations to pay for the war caused unrest in much of the Spanish Empire, including the 1781 Revolt of the Comuneros in New Granada. In the end, the Spanish siege of Gibraltar absorbed British resources that might otherwise have been used in America but left them with little to show for their investment.

When Yorktown surrendered in October 1781, Britain accepted defeat in North America, but inflicted heavy casualties on the French fleet at the Battle of the Saintes in April 1782. This had a significant impact on France's ability and desire to continue the war and they began negotiations with Britain on a peace settlement. Spain insisted on continuing the war until Gibraltar fell, as stipulated by the Treaty but withdrew that requirement after the disastrous repulse of a combined French and Spanish assault in September 1782.

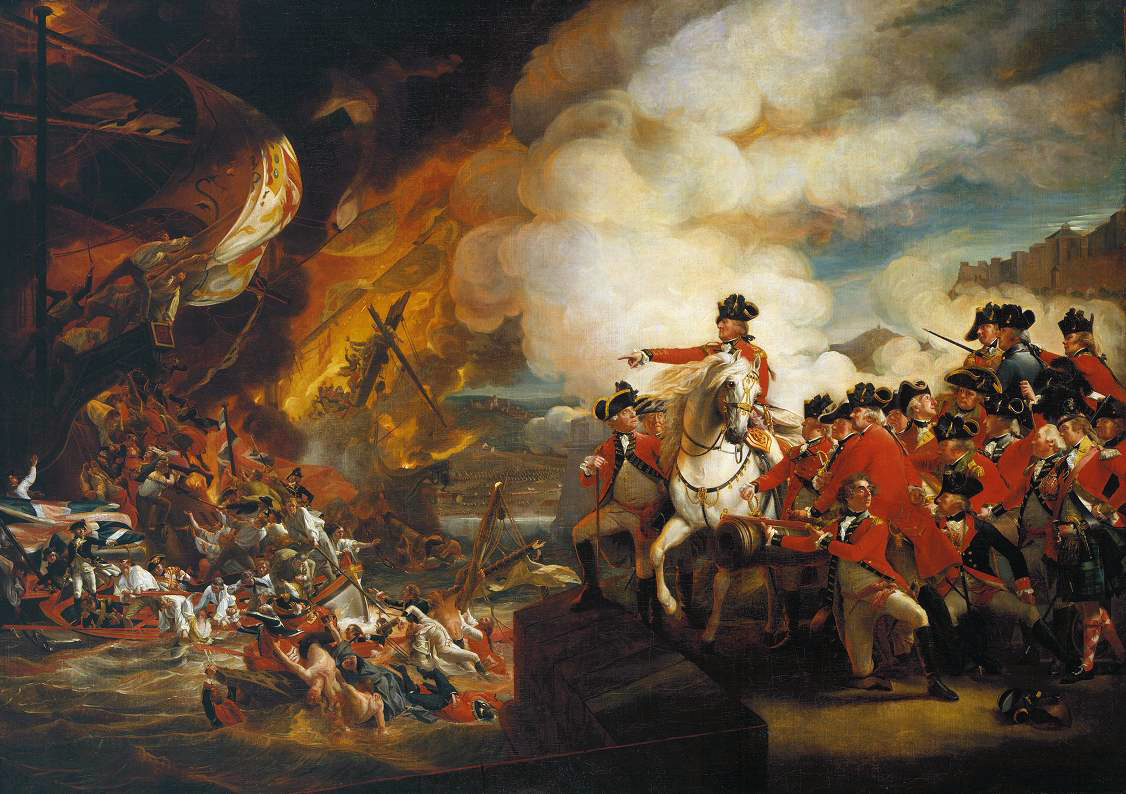
The Grand Assault, Gibraltar, September 1782; defeat persuaded Spain to end the war

The Spanish and French sought to create a US that was dependent on them for support against Britain, thus reversing the losses of 1763. To achieve this, they tried to negotiate a settlement with Britain excluding the Americans; France proposed setting the western boundary of the US along the Appalachians, matching the British 1763 Proclamation Line. The Spanish suggested additional concessions in the vital Mississippi River Basin, as well as the cession of Georgia in violation of the Franco-American alliance.

British strategy was to strengthen the US sufficiently to prevent France regaining a foothold in North America, and they had little interest in these proposals. Divisions between their opponents allowed them to negotiate separately with each to improve their overall position; they agreed preliminary terms with the United States in September 1782, leaving France and Spain isolated. The British relief of Gibraltar in February 1783 strengthened their position, while weakening Spanish resolve, leading to the 1783 treaties with France and Spain. With the exception of Menorca and Florida, these largely returned the position to that prevailing before the war.

== Footnotes ==
=== References ===
- Allison, David K; Ferreiro, Larrie D, eds. (2018). The American Revolution: A World War. Smithsonian Institution. ISBN 978-1588346599.
- Black, Jeremy (2011). Fighting for America: The Struggle for Mastery in North America, 1519–1871. Indiana University Press. ISBN 978-0253005618.
- Cogliano, Francis D. (2003). Revolutionary America, 1763-1815: A Political History. Francis and Taylor. ISBN 978-1-1346-7869-3.
- Davenport, Frances G; Paullin, Charles O. (1917). European Treaties Bearing on the History of the United States and Its Dependencies. Vol. IV. Washington, D.C. Carnegie Institution of Washington.
- Donlan, Sean Patrick (2014). Duve, Thomas (ed.). Spanish West Florida and the American Territory of New Orleans 1803-1810 in Entanglements in Legal History. Republic GmbH. ISBN 978-3944773001.
- Ferling, John (2009). Almost A Miracle: The American Victory in the War of Independence. Oxford University Press, USA. ISBN 978-0195382921.
- Harvey, Robert (2001). A Few Bloody Noses: The American Revolutionary War. John Murray. ISBN 978-0719561412.
- Kaplan, Lawrence (September 1983). "The Treaty of Paris, 1783; A Historiographical Challenge". International History Review. 5 (3): 431–442. doi:10.1080/07075332.1983.9640322. JSTOR 431–442.
- Marley, David (1998). Wars of the Americas: A Chronology of Armed Conflict in the Western Hemisphere (2008 ed.). ABC-CLIO. ISBN 1598841009.
- Moses, Bernard (1919). Spain's Declining Power in South America, 1730-1806 (2010 ed.). Cornell University Library. ISBN 1112594191.
- Owens, David (1993). "Spanish—Portuguese Territorial Rivalry in Colonial Río de la Plata". Yearbook (Conference of Latin Americanist Geographers). 19: 15–24. JSTOR 25765781.
- Renouf, Stephen. "Spain in the American Revolution" (PDF). Spain Society; SAR.
- Stein, Stanley; Stein, Barbara (2003). Apogee of Empire: Spain and New Spain in the Age of Charles III, 1759–1789. Johns Hopkins University Press. ISBN 0801873398.
- Weeks, William (2013). The New Cambridge History of American Foreign Relations: Volume 1 (2015 ed.). Cambridge University Press. ISBN 978-1107536227.
- Revolution: Diplomacy
