= First Cevallos expedition =

1762–1763 military campaign

- Part of the Fantastic War and the Anglo-Spanish War
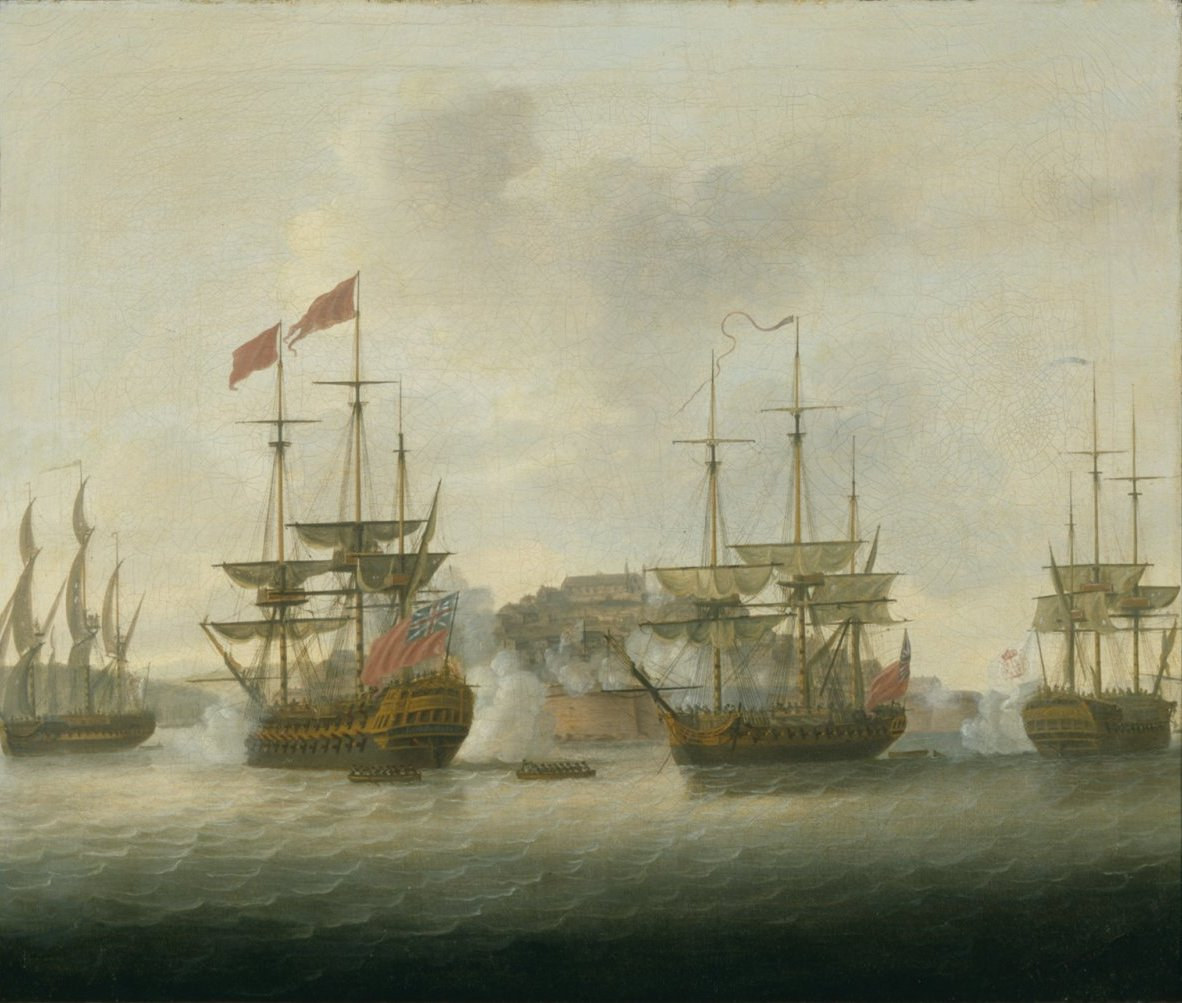
- A painting of the Anglo-Portuguese bombardment of Colonia del Sacramento
| Date | 3 September 1762 – 24 April 1763 |
| Location | South America |
| Result | Spanish victory |

Belligerents
| Spain | Portugal; Great Britain |

Commanders and leaders
| Pedro de Cevallos | Vicente da Silva; Robert McNamara † |

Strength
| 1 frigate 1 merchantman 3 dispatch boats 12 gunboats 15 troopships 2,700 soldiers | 1 ship of the line 2 frigates 2 troopships 5 store ships 2,886 soldiers |

Casualties and losses
| 12 killed 200 wounded | 373 killed 40 wounded 2,660 captured 1 ship of the line destroyed |

The First Cevallos expedition was a series of Spanish military operations in South America during the Fantastic War. Under the command of the governor of Buenos Aires, Pedro de Cevallos, the expedition captured the Portuguese settlement of Colónia do Sacramento and fought off a joint Anglo-Portuguese attempt to recapture it. All military activities in the region concluded with the 1763 Treaty of Paris.

In 1762, Spain entered the Seven Years' War on the side of France as part of the Family Compact, motivated in part by diplomatic efforts on the part of the French government. Having been notified months in advance that Spain was planning to enter the conflict and declare war on Portugal, Cevallos launched an expedition against Colónia do Sacramento on 3 September 1762, sailing at the head of an expeditionary fleet from Buenos Aires which carried 2,700 soldiers. The Portuguese authorities in Colónia do Sacramento, already alerted to Cevallos' plans, received reinforcements on 24 September.

The expedition arrived near Colónia do Sacramento on 7 September and began to besiege it on 1 October. By 3 November, the settlement capitulated to the Spanish. A month later, a joint Anglo-Portuguese expedition attempted to recapture it, attacking the city walls by bombarding it; after a British warship was destroyed, the Anglo-Portuguese force withdrew. From January to April 1763, Cevallos launched several attacks on Portuguese outposts in the region, capturing the forts of Santa Tereza and San Miguel and occupying the village of Rio Grande. There, Cevallos learned of the Treaty of Paris and concluded his campaign.

The expedition's success was received positively in Spain, as the war had gone badly for the Spanish on all other fronts. Under the terms of the Treaty of Paris, Colónia do Sacramento was returned to Portugal, though other outposts captured by Cevallos remained under Spanish control. The Portuguese refused to accept losing control over these outposts, launching several incursions into Spanish-held territory; these actions eventually resulted in an undeclared war breaking out between Spain and Portugal between 1776 and 1777. During this conflict, Cevallos once again captured Colónia do Sacramento, and it was permanently ceded to Spain in the First Treaty of San Ildefonso.

== Background ==
In 1761, Spain joined the ongoing Seven Years' War (1756–1763) on the side of France as part of the Family Compact, an alliance between the two nations. This was due in part to successful diplomatic efforts by French Foreign Minister Étienne François, duc de Choiseul to bring the Spanish into the war, and in part due to Charles III of Spain fearing for the security of his American colonies along with fears that France would conclude a unilateral peace with Great Britain. On 15 August 1761, the two nations signed the Family Compact, which was to go into effect after the annual Spanish treasure fleet returned to Spain, signalling to the British that Spain intended to enter the conflict.

In December 1761, the Spanish government placed economic sanctions on British trade in Spain, ordering the seizure of British-owned goods and the expulsion of British merchants. In response to these actions, the British government declared war on Spain on 4 January 1762. On March 1762, the Spanish frigate Victoria arrived in South America and informed the governor of Buenos Aires, Pedro Antonio de Cevallos, of the impending war and Spanish plans to declare war on Portugal. Cevallos spent the next few months making secret preparations for mounting an expedition against Portuguese settlements in the region, though, by 27 July, the Portuguese authorities at the colonial settlement of Colónia do Sacramento became aware of these preparations and made plans to withstand a Spanish invasion.

On 3 September 1762, a Spanish fleet under the command of Cevallos set sail from Buenos Aires, consisting of the 26-gun Victoria under the command of lieutenant Carlos José de Sarria, the merchant ship Santa Cruz, 3 dispatch boats, 12 gunboats, and 15 troopships carrying 700 regular infantrymen, 200 dragoons, 1,800 militia and numerous Indian labourers. Concurrently, a 113-wagon siege train set out overland from Montevideo to assist the fleet in its operations. On 7 September, the Spanish fleet arrived near the Colónia do Sacramento and began the week-long disembarking process. Cevallos waited for final authorisation from Madrid of his attack on the Portuguese settlement before proceeding with the assault, which arrived on 28 September.

Meanwhile, the Portuguese garrison at Colónia do Sacramento, which consisted of 400 regular infantrymen, 40 cavalrymen, 32 artillery gunners, 230 militia, and the crew of ten small vessels in the port harbour, was reinforced by a 10-ship convoy from Rio de Janeiro on 24 September. The convoy, escorted by the frigate Nossa Senhora da Estrêla (commanded by Captain João da Costa de Ataíde) and the brigantine São Pedro e São Paulo, brought 65 regular infantrymen and large quantities of supplies and armaments to the garrison.

== Expedition ==
=== Siege of Colónia do Sacramento ===
By 1 October 1762, the Spanish expeditionary force was one and a half miles away from Colónia do Sacramento, proclaiming their intentions to attack the Portuguese settlement while simultaneously erecting a siege camp. The Portuguese defenders started to target the expeditionary force with the settlement's artillery on 5 October after the Spanish drew close to the city walls. Responding with heated shot from their artillery, the Spanish demanded the settlement's defenders to surrender on 6 October, which was promptly rejected. The naval element of the Spanish expedition maintained a loose blockade of the settlement, allowing Portuguese vessels to resupply the besieged garrison continually.

On 11 October, two batteries of Spanish 24- and 18-pounders started to bombard the city walls while mortars dropped bombs behind the Portuguese ramparts. By 20 October, the bombardment had caused two holes in the city walls, and a week later, Cevallos began negotiations for the surrender of the city with the wounded Portuguese garrison commander, brigadier general Vicente da Silva da Fonseca rather than attempt to storm the ramparts. By 30 October, both sides agreed to the terms of capitulation, and three days later, 2,355 Portuguese soldiers and sailors marched out of the settlement with full honours of war; 1,600 civilians left the settlement as well. Spanish casualties during the siege amounted to 12 killed and 200 wounded, while their prizes of war included 87 artillery pieces and 26 ships anchored in the Colónia do Sacramento roadstead, mostly British merchantmen.

=== River Plate campaign ===
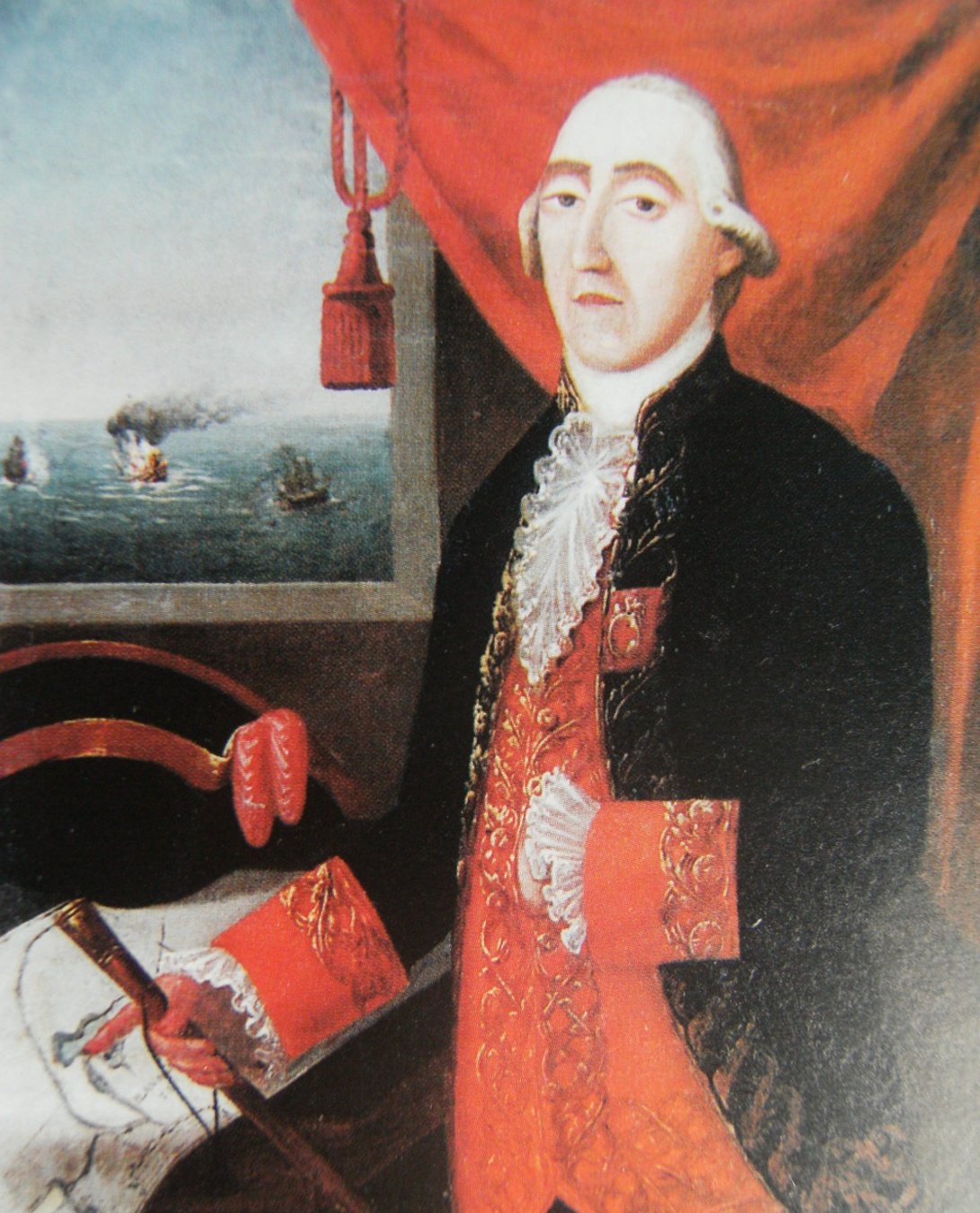
A portrait of Spanish naval officer Don Francisco Javier Melgarejo, showing the Lord Clive sinking in the background

On 2 November 1762, an Anglo-Portuguese expedition arrived at Rio de Janeiro; the British component of the expedition consisted of the privateers Lord Clive (a 50-gun ship of the line commanded by former East India Company officer Robert McNamara) and Ambuscade (a 26-gun frigate commanded by William Roberts). Both ships had been purchased from the Royal Navy by a group of British investors in London. During a stopover at Lisbon, the expedition was joined by a Portuguese fleet of 2 troopships and 5 store ships under the command of lieutenant colonel Vasco Fernandes Pinto Alpoim carrying 500 soldiers. The expedition, which was hoping to attack Spanish settlements on the River Plate before the colonial authorities there were informed of the outbreak of war between Spain and Portugal, had set sail for Brazil on 3 August 1762.

On 21 November, the Anglo-Portuguese expeditionary force, bolstered by the 38-gun Portuguese Navy frigate Glória, arrived at the River Plate. McNamara decided against launching an attack after discovering that the Spanish defenders were already informed of the outbreak of war. He then ordered his fleet to sail towards Colónia do Sacramento, hoping to retake the captured settlement. On 6 January 1763, the Anglo-Portuguese warships anchored offshore close to the Colónia do Sacramento fortifications. They began bombarding it while the Portuguese troopships and store ships waited further out at sea. After a three-hour bombardment of the city walls, counter-fire from the Spanish defenders caused a fire on the Lord Clive, eventually spreading to the powder magazine, which exploded, destroying the ship and killing 272 crew members, including McNamara. The damaged Ambuscade, which had suffered casualties amounting to 40 crew members killed and 105 wounded, led the defeated expedition back to Rio de Janeiro.

=== Further Spanish operations ===
On January 1763, after his refurbishment of Colónia do Sacramento, Cevallos led two columns in a sweep throughout the region of modern-day Uruguay against other Portuguese outposts. The Portuguese fort of Santa Tereza, garrisoned with only 150 unpaid and demoralized soldiers, was swiftly captured on 19 February; shortly thereafter, the Spanish moved to attack the fort of San Miguel. The fort's garrison launched an unsuccessful 400-man sortie against the 3,000-strong besieging Spaniards, which resulted in 305 Portuguese soldiers becoming prisoners of war and the capture of the fort. These offensives resulted in Portuguese governor Eloy Madureira ordering the village of Rio Grande to be abandoned in the face of the advancing Spaniards, who occupied the settlement on 24 April. There, Cevallos learned of the signing of the Treaty of Paris, which stipulated that all hostilities between the belligerent powers cease by 8 April. As a result of this, Cevallos concluded his campaign, bringing an end to hostilities in the region.

== Aftermath ==
Though the expedition did not influence the terms of the Treaty of Paris, the Spanish successes in South America contrasted with their failures in the other theatres of war, including a failed invasion of Portugal and major defeats at Havana and Manila. As historian Manuel Fernández Álvarez noted:

In January 1762, Spain opened hostilities with England [and against Portugal on 5 May 1762]. However, the effects were very different from those expected... The outcome: the loss of Havana and Manila [and most of the Rio Negro Valley in North Brazil] while our army engaged an unfortunate ground campaign against Portugal. Only the conquest of Colónia do Sacramento by Pedro Cevallos, from Uruguay, put a positive note on the Spanish side, but however, had no influence on subsequent agreements that ended the war.

Upon receiving news of Cevallos' successes in South America, Charles III responded by saying:

[This victory] fills me with joy for the honour of my troops, since for everything else it is not that way.

Colónia do Sacramento was returned to Portugal as part of the terms of the Treaty of Paris, while Santa Tereza (which had been extensively refurbished on Cevallos' orders), San Miguel and Rio Grande remained under Spanish control. The Portuguese refused to accept losing control over these outposts, launching several cross-border cattle raids and harassing Spanish military elements across the border. These actions eventually resulted in an undeclared war breaking out between Spain and Portugal from 1776 to 1777. During this conflict, Cevallos recaptured Colónia do Sacramento, resulting in the settlement being permanently ceded to the Spain as part of the terms of the First Treaty of San Ildefonso.

== See also ==
- Second Cevallos expedition
