= Mohamed Ben Othman Al Meknassi =

Moroccan historian and diplomat

Mohamed Ben Othman Al Meknassi was a Moroccan historian, writer, and diplomat.

== Biography ==
Born into a distinguished Meknes family, Al Meknassi studied at University of al-Qarawiyyin before rising to become an advisor to Sultan Moulay Mohammed Ben Abdallah.

In 1779, the Sultan appointed him as an ambassador to Spain to negotiate the release of Muslim captives and to conclude peace and trade treaties, successfully resulting in the Treaty of Aranjuez and the Spanish-Moroccan treaty (1799). These experiences inspired Al Meknassi's writing career, with works such as Al Iksir Fi Fikak Al Assir, detailing his diplomatic voyage and cultural observations.

Recognized for his accomplishments, Al Meknassi served as a minister under Sultan Mohammed III and later as the Governor of Tétouan and Prime Minister under Moulay Slimane. His diplomatic and literary contributions significantly influenced Moroccan history and international relations.
