= Fantastic War =

Theatre of the Seven Years' War

- Part of the Seven Years' War
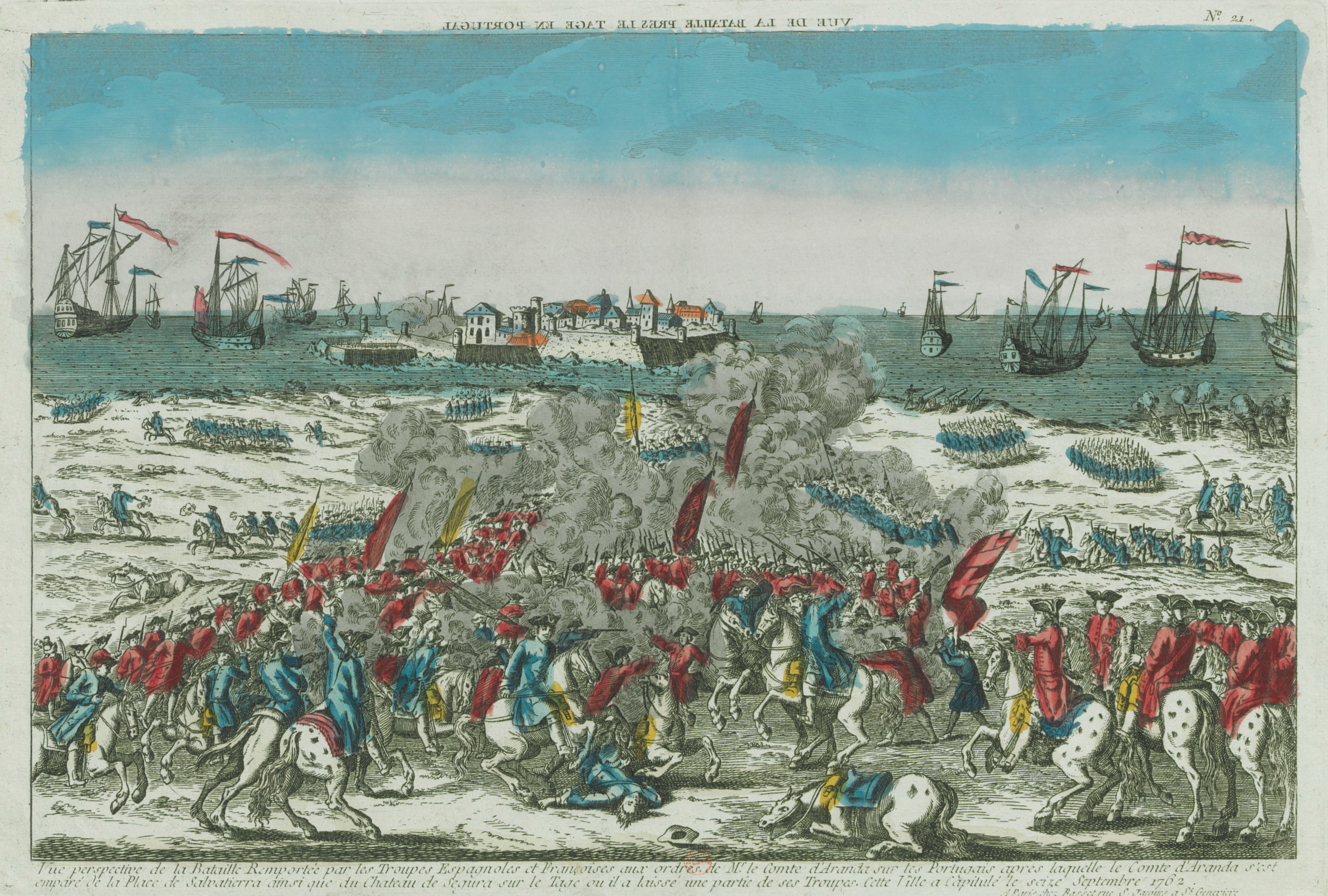
- Battle of Salvaterra de Magos won by Spanish and French troops, led by the Count of Aranda, against the Portuguese in September 1762
Date	1762–1763
Location	Portugal, Spain, South America
Result	Anglo–Portuguese victory in Europe; Stalemate in South America: Portugal defeats Spain in Mato Grosso, Rio Negro, and Rio Pardo; Spain defeats Portugal in Uruguay, and most of Rio Grande do Sul; Treaty of Paris

Belligerents
Portugal; Great Britain	Spain; France

Commanders and leaders
(Portugal) Count of Lippe; (Kingdom of Great Britain) Earl of Loudoun; (Kingdom of Great Britain) George Townshend; (Kingdom of Great Britain) John Burgoyne	(Spain) Marquis of Sarria; (Spain) Count of Aranda; (Spain) Antonio de Cevallos

Strength
Iberian Theatre: 7–8,000 Portuguese; 7,104 British	Iberian Theatre: 30,000 Spanish; 12,000 French

Casualties and losses
Iberian Theatre: very low: (14 British soldiers killed in combat and 804 by disease or accidents; Portuguese losses low.); Unknown guerrillas	Iberian Theatre: 25,000 Spaniards dead, missing, or captured 5,000 French dead, missing, or captured

The Spanish–Portuguese War (1762–1763) or Fantastic War (Portuguese: Guerra Fantástica; French: Guerre Fantastique; Mirandese: Guerra de l Mirandun; Spanish: Guerra Fantástica) was fought as part of the Seven Years' War. The first and main theatre of the war was an invasion of Portugal by Spain in alliance with France against the Anglo-Portuguese Alliance, which ended after three disastrous invasions. The second theatre was a Spanish invasion of Portuguese colonies in South America. Though tactically successful for the Spanish in the strategically important area on and near the River Plate, their gains there were largely given up in the peace negotiations, resulting in a strategic success for the Portuguese in South America.

Because no major battles were fought in the Portuguese segment of the war, even though there were numerous movements of troops and heavy losses among the Franco-Spanish invaders, this theatre of the Seven Years' War is known in Portuguese historiography as the Fantastic War (Portuguese and Spanish: Guerra Fantástica) in the sense of phantom war, due to the successful Portuguese strategy of starving the invading Franco-Spanish army of supplies while avoiding or minimising pitched battles.

The war ended along with the Seven Years' War in the 1763 Treaty of Paris.

== Background ==
When the Seven Years' War between France and Great Britain started in 1754, Spain and Portugal remained neutral, their differences in South America having been settled by the Treaty of Madrid of 1750. Ricardo Wall, prime minister to King Ferdinand VI of Spain, was opposed to the pro-French party at court who wanted to enter the war on the side of France.

All this changed when Ferdinand died in 1759 and was succeeded by his younger half-brother Charles III. The more ambitious Charles was motivated to preserve Spain's position as a leading European and colonial power. By 1761 France looked to be losing the war against Great Britain. Fearing a British victory over France, Charles signed the Family Compact with France (both countries were ruled by branches of the House of Bourbon) in August, and claimed compensation for attacks by English privateers in Spanish waters. This brought war with Great Britain in January 1762. Portugal had been weakened by the disastrous 1755 Lisbon earthquake, leading Prime Minister Sebastião José de Carvalho e Melo, Marquis of Pombal, to direct all efforts towards the reconstruction of the country and neglected the armed forces, in which he had little interest. A new treaty between Spain and Portugal, the Treaty of El Pardo of 1761, rendered the Treaty of Madrid null and void.

At the urging of the French government, Spain agreed to attack Portugal, which had been neutral, but served as an important economic ally of Great Britain. The invasion was not intended to conquer Portugal but to create a new front that would draw away British forces, now directed against France.

The third Franco-Spanish invasion of Portugal in Europe (main theatre of the war, which absorbed much of the Spanish war effort), on 5 May 1762, was followed by a Spanish invasion of Portuguese territories in South America (a secondary theatre of the war). While the first ended in humiliating defeat, the second represented a stalemate: Portuguese victory in remote areas in northern and western Brazil; Spanish victory in the strategically sensitive area on and near the River Plate.

== Peninsular theatre ==
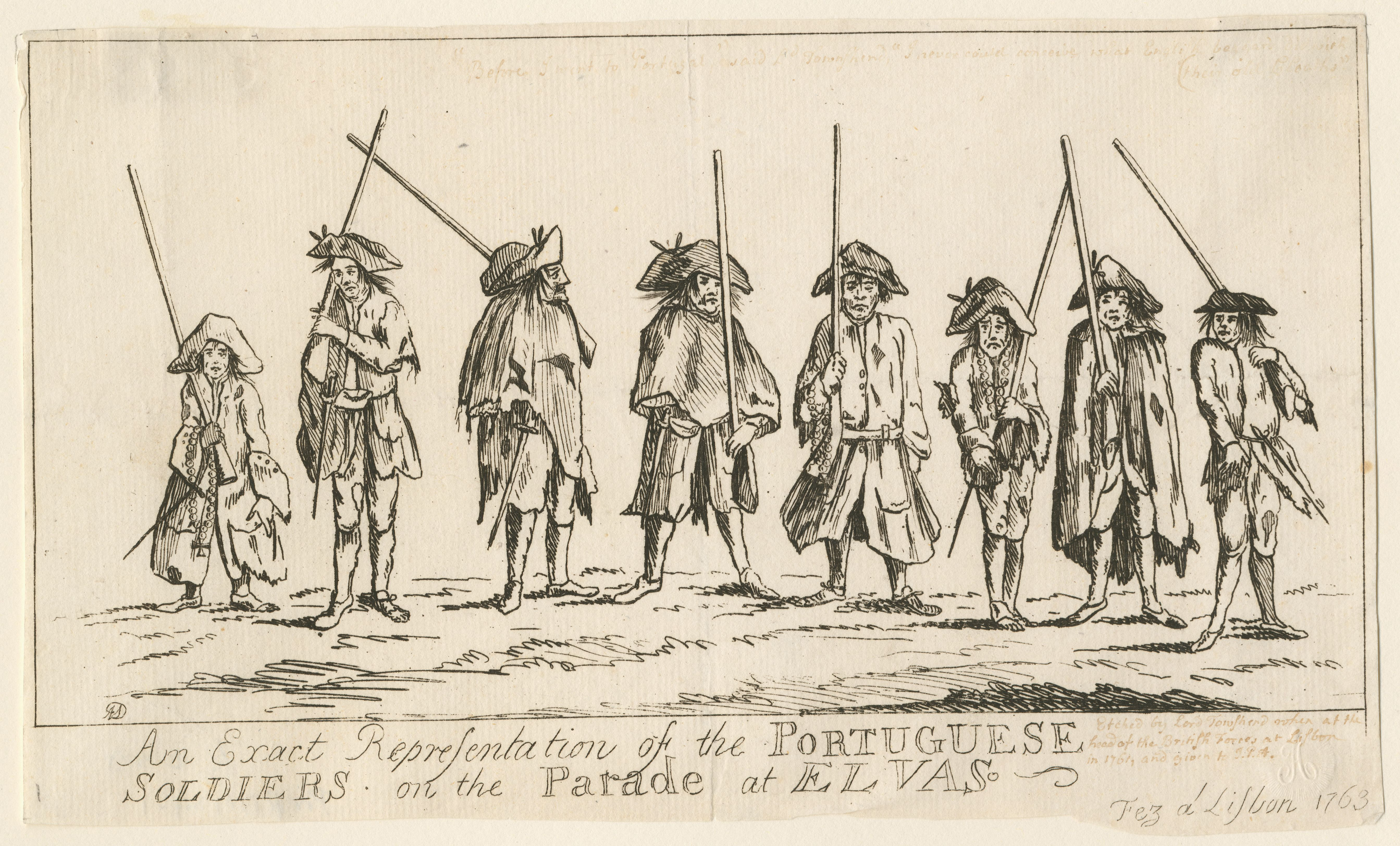
Portuguese militiamen of Elvas, drawing by Lord George Townshend, 1763

During the war, a Franco-Spanish army of about 42,000 men, first led by Nicolás de Carvajal, Marquis of Sarria and then by Pedro Pablo Abarca de Bolea, 10th Count of Aranda, invaded Portugal in 1762, in three different regions at three different times: provinces of Trás-os-Montes (May–June 1762), province of Beira (July–November 1762) and Alentejo (November 1762). They were faced by ferocious popular resistance and, from the middle of the second invasion onwards, by an Anglo-Portuguese army of nearly 15,000 men commanded by William, Count of Schaumburg-Lippe.

In the first invasion, the Spanish – whose final goal was Porto, the second city of the kingdom – occupied without opposition several undefended towns and ruined fortresses of the Trás-os-Montes Province; there were neither regular soldiers nor gunpowder in the entire province, except in the fortress of Miranda do Douro. However, guerrillas exploited the mountainous nature of the province to cut off the invaders' supply and communication lines with Spain as well as to inflict heavy losses. The Portuguese abandoned their villages, inducing famine among the Spaniards, who launched two offensives towards Porto: the first was defeated by the militia and peasants at the Battle of Douro and the second was beaten off at the mountains of Montalegre. This failure and the arrival of Portuguese reinforcements (including regular troops) forced the now diminished Spanish army to retreat into Spain, abandoning all their conquests (except Chaves). After this defeat, the Franco-Spanish commander, Sarria, was replaced by the Count of Aranda.

During this first invasion of Portugal, the total Spanish casualties, according to a contemporaneous French source, Charles François Dumouriez, were 10,000 men: prisoners, deserters or deaths by hunger, guerrilla ambushes and disease (8,000 according to modern Spanish military historian José Luis Terrón Ponce). At the request of Portugal, one British force of 7,107 soldiers and officers landed in Lisbon, deeply reorganizing the Portuguese army (7 to 8,000 regular soldiers). The supreme command of the allied army (from 14 to 15,000 men) was delivered to one of the best soldiers of his time: the Count of Lippe.

In the beginning of the second invasion (province of Lower Beira, July–November 1762), the Franco-Spaniards captured several poorly equipped Portuguese fortresses and towns, including Almeida. However, the Anglo-Portuguese army defeated a Spanish corps which was preparing another invasion through the province of Alentejo at the Battle of Valencia de Alcántara, and foiled the Spanish attempt to cross the river Tagus, defeating them at Vila Velha.

The allied army eventually stopped the Bourbon army's march toward Lisbon in the mountains near Abrantes (which by its position dominated the country) and used a scorched earth strategy – in cooperation with the rural population – to starve the invaders: peasants abandoned their villages, destroying or taking with them all the food, while the guerrillas attacked their logistic lines. The invaders had to choose between stay and starve or withdraw.

The outcome was the destruction of the Franco-Spanish army, whose remnants – leaving their wounded and sick behind – were chased to Spain by the Anglo-Portuguese army and peasants, after two encirclement movements undertaken by a Portuguese force under General George Townshend, 1st Marquess Townshend toward the enemy's rear: the first move forced the Bourbons to withdraw from the hills east of Abrantes to Castelo Branco, while the second made them flee to Spain. The Spanish headquarters (Castelo Branco), was captured by the allied army, which took thousands of prisoners (2 November 1762).

"The region was devastated, there were no provisions... The burning of villages punished the vengeance of the inhabitants; but these punishments only made crueler the fate of the Spanish armies.
Then the small Anglo-Portuguese army took the offensive. The Count of Lippe gave the order to attack. Loudon [in reality it was Townshend] was ordered to join the troops of General Lennox and to place himself between Almeida and Badajoz. This way, the line of retreat of Aranda's army... would be threatened. Aranda [immobilized by the excellent Anglo-Portuguese defensive positions in the mountains near Abrantes] was forced to choose between withdrawing or starve to death in Beira. (...). General Loudon [Townshend] managed to occupy Fundão, making the Spanish advanced guards withdraw. The Spanish army retreated [towards Castelo Branco, closer to the Spanish border], and the Portuguese troops advanced, reoccupying Vila Velha, and Loudon's force recovered Penamacor and Monsanto; while another officer, Field Marshal Fraser, chased the enemy with two battalions and four cavalry regiments.
Then, taking advantage of the disorder caused by the withdrawal, The Count of Lippe outlined a plan that would imprison Aranda and all his army in Castelo Branco [The Spanish headquarters]. Bad weather delayed the operation and an informer reported the Spanish commander about the intentions of Lippe. The Spanish army hastily retreated to his own country. The last enemy troops withdrew ... and shortly after, the Portuguese occupied again the border posts with the exception of Chaves and Almeida ...",

— In Arquivo Nacional.

The total Franco-Spanish losses in this second invasion were evaluated by a contemporaneous Bourbon source as 15,000 men (Charles François Dumouriez in 1766), while the total casualties for both the invasions were about 30,000 men, according to the British minister in Portugal, Edward Hay (8 November 1762).

As explained by historians Danley Mark and Patrick Speelman:

"... Bourbon casualties mounted because the Portuguese peasantry waged a relentless war of revenge against deserters and retreating soldiers who they captured and massacred in large numbers (p. 452)....The Portuguese campaign, indeed the entire Spanish war, lay in ruins (p. 521)."

— The Seven Year’s War: Global Views

During the third Spanish offensive (November 1762), the Spaniards attacked by surprise two Portuguese towns (Ouguela and Marvão) – but were defeated - and had to retreat again before the reinforced and advancing Anglo-Portuguese army, which took some prisoners. Additional Spanish prisoners were taken when a Portuguese force led by British Colonel Wrey entered Spain and attacked the region of Codicera on 19 November.

Thus, Aranda, with his forces ruined and demoralized, sent to Lippe an emissary proposing an armistice on 24 November, which was accepted and signed on 1 December 1762.

== South American theatre ==
=== River Plate ===
In South America, the Spanish Cevallos expedition (3,900 men) was more successful. In present-day Uruguay, they captured Colónia do Sacramento (with 767 defenders) and two other fortresses: fort of Santa Teresa (with 400 defenders), on 19 April 1763; and fort of San Miguel (with 30 defenders), in 23 April.

=== Southern Brazil ===
Cevallos advanced and won a still greater victory when he conquered most of the vast and rich territory of the so-called "Continente de São Pedro do Rio Grande do Sul" – the present-day Brazilian state of Rio Grande do Sul, where the Portuguese had only up to 1,000 men (soldiers and militia). São José do Norte and the capital – S. Pedro do Sul- were abandoned without a fight. However, a Spanish militia was routed by the Portuguese in the Battle of Santa Bárbara (1 January 1763), when an invading army of 500 Spanish and 2,000 Indians, in cooperation with Cevallos, tried to conquer Rio Pardo, nearly the only remaining Portuguese territory in Rio Grande do Sul: seven cannons, 9,000 head of cattle and 5,000 horses were captured. This huge territory would be completely retaken by the Portuguese during the so-called "deaf war" (1763–1777).

=== Mato Grosso ===
A Spanish army of 600 or 1,200 men (according to the sources) tried to retake the territory of Mato Grosso, in the right bank of the Guaporé River, besieging the fortress of Conceição (the "door" for the gold-rich Province of Mato Grosso). The 100 defenders, after receiving reinforcements, not only resisted but conquered and occupied – until the end of the war – the reductions of San Miguel and San Martin, which were main sources of Spanish supply and were located on the left bank of the river Guaporé, the Spanish side. They also engaged in biological warfare. The Spaniards withdrew – after losing half of their men from hunger, disease and desertion – leaving the Portuguese in the possession of the disputed territory. Rolim Moura was rewarded with the vice-royalty of Brazil for this victory.

=== Amazonia ===
The Portuguese conquered most of the valley of Rio Negro, expelling the Spaniards from S. Gabriel and S. josé de Maribatanas (1763) and building two fortresses there with the Spanish cannons.

== Aftermath ==
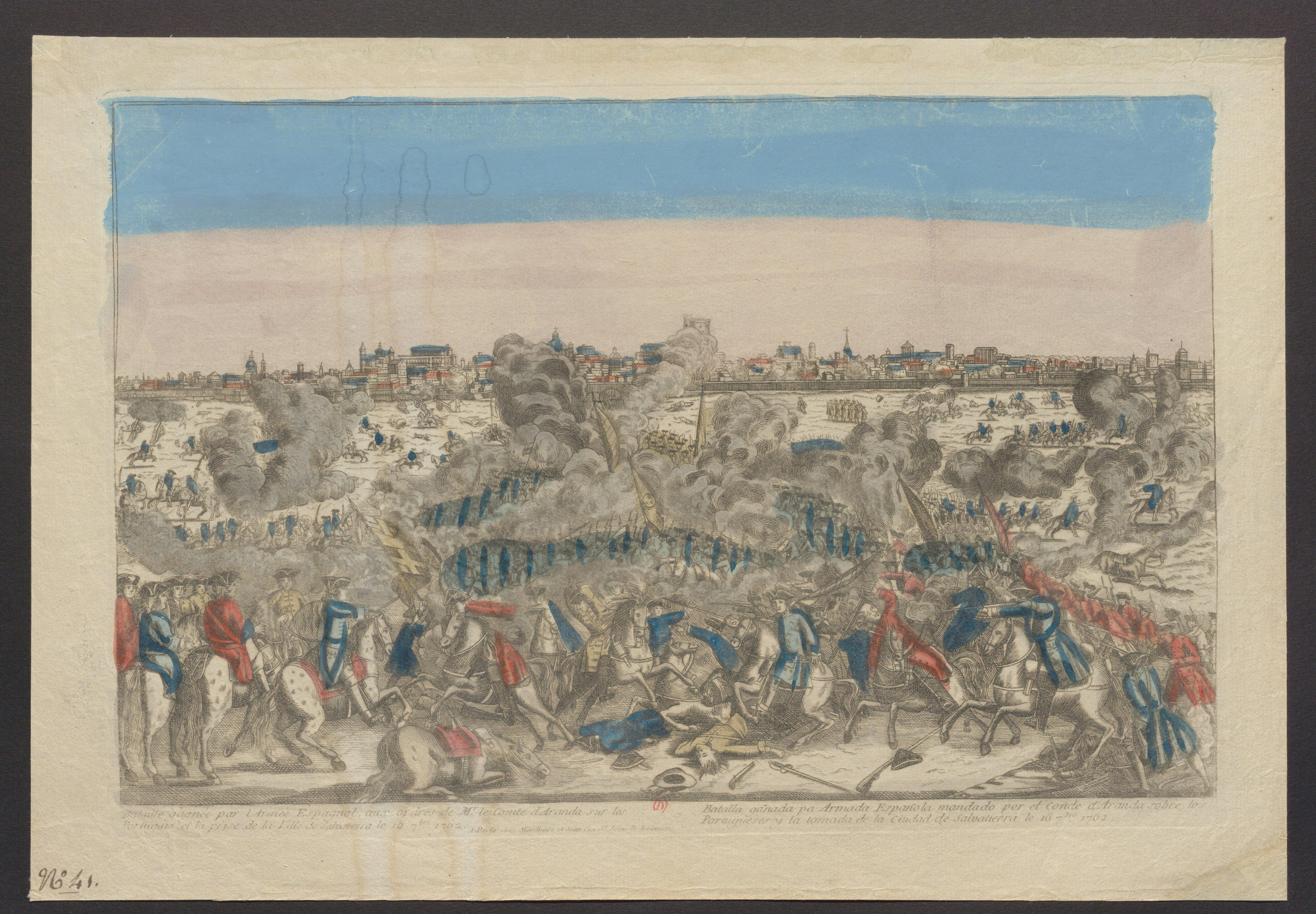
Another etching depicting the clash in Salvaterra de Magos on 16 September 1762

With the signing of the Treaty of Paris, relations between Spain and Portugal were restored to the status quo ante bellum.

=== Europe ===
Spain was forced to return to Portugal the small cities of Almeida and Chaves on the Spanish-Portuguese frontier. All the other cities and strongholds had been retaken by Anglo-Portuguese forces during the chase of the remnants of the Franco-Spanish troops.

=== South America ===
While the Spanish-Portuguese South American colonial conflict during the Seven Years' War ended in a tactical success for the Spanish forces under Cevallos' able command, it would represent a Portuguese strategic victory in the short run with the results of the peace negotiations. Apart for the forts of Santa Teresa and San Miguel, the Spanish would lose to the Portuguese all the territory they had conquered during the war. Colonia del Sacramento was given back by the same treaty and Rio Grande do Sul would be retaken from the Spanish Army during the undeclared war of 1763–1777 and Portugal retained all its conquests (Rio Negro Valley and Guaporé River's right bank/Mato Grosso).

== See also ==
- War of the Spanish Succession
  - Portugal in the War of Spanish Succession
- Spanish–Portuguese War (1735–1737)
- Spanish–Portuguese War (1776–1777)
