= First Treaty of San Ildefonso =

1777 treaty between Spain and Portugal

Treaty of Peace and territorial limits between Spain and Portugal.
- Spanish and Portuguese empires c. 1790, including borders set by the Treaty of San Ildefonso
- Context: Spain and Portugal settle territorial disputes in the Río de la Plata region
- Signed: 1 October 1777
- Location: Royal Palace of La Granja de San Ildefonso
- Negotiators: Count of Floridablanca; D. Francisco Inocêncio de Sousa Coutinho
- Parties: Kingdom of Portugal; Kingdom of Spain

The First Treaty of San Ildefonso, 1 October 1777, fixed borders between the colonial possessions in South America held by Spain and Portugal, primarily in the Río de la Plata region.

== Background ==
For nearly 300 years, differing interpretations of the Treaty of Tordesillas led to disputes between Spain and Portugal over the Río de la Plata region. Although Spanish silver mines in Potosí were far to the west of the disputed area, Portugal constantly tried to annex this region to its Brazilian colonies.

The 1750 Treaty of Madrid sought to resolve the dispute, but it was annulled in 1761 by the new Spanish monarch Charles III. In 1762, Spain entered the Seven Years' War on the side of France, resulting in the so-called Fantastic War of 1762-1763 with Portugal. With British support, the Portuguese repulsed a Franco-Spanish invasion in Europe. In South America, Spain captured the Portuguese port of Colonia del Sacramento, now in Uruguay and much of the modern-day Brazilian state of Rio Grande do Sul. However, the Treaty of Paris (1763) required Spain to return Colonia del Sacramento and by 1777, Portugal reoccupied Rio Grande do Sul. (Note: This was done during the so-called War of the Deaf or undeclared war of 1763-1777.)

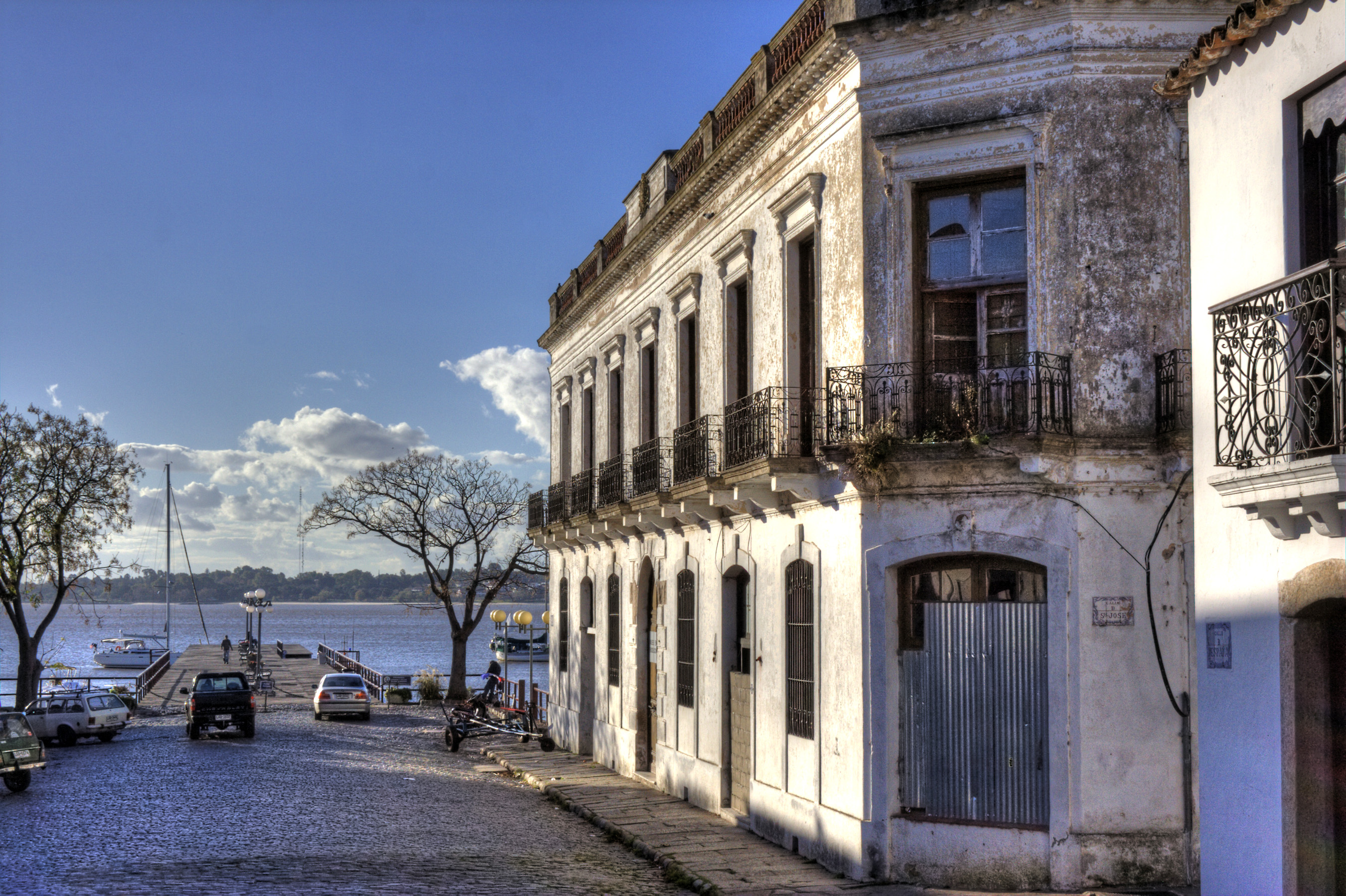
Colonia del Sacramento; the wharf built by Spain in 1860

The Viceroyalty of Peru required all trade with Spanish America to pass through Lima on the Pacific, a policy made imports expensive, prevented the economic development of the Atlantic coast and caused increasing dissatisfaction with Spanish rule. Portuguese encroachments in the Río de la Plata allowed their merchants to evade these commercial restrictions, and Buenos Aires subsequently become a major centre for smuggled goods. In an attempt to regain economic and political control, a new Viceroyalty of the Río de la Plata was established in 1776, with its capital at Buenos Aires. (Note: The Viceroyalty included modern Argentina, Bolivia, Paraguay and Uruguay.) Despite opposition from Lima, limited free trade was permitted between Buenos Aires, Montevideo and mainland Spain.

Between 1775 and 1776, the undeclared war in the region between the two countries grew increasingly bitter, although the Spanish–Portuguese War only formally began in 1776. In February 1777, the new Viceroy of Río de la Plata, Pedro de Cevallos took command of a Spanish expeditionary force of 116 ships and 19,000 troops. He captured the island of Santa Catarina in February before moving against Colonia del Sacramento which surrendered in July.

In August, Cevallos learned Joseph I of Portugal had died in February; his daughter, Maria I now sued for peace and offensive operations ceased.

== Provisions ==
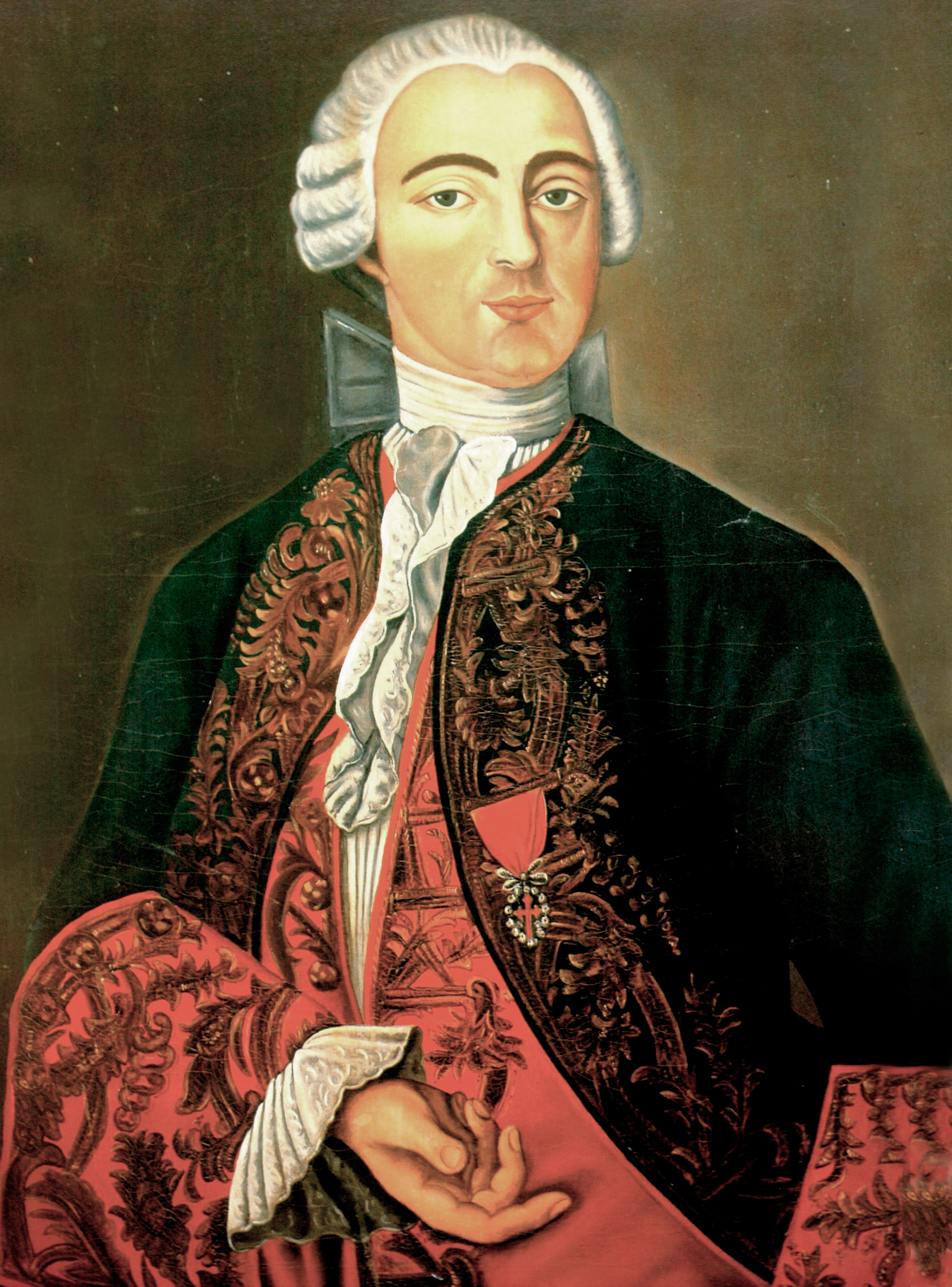
Pedro de Cevallos, Viceroy of Río de la Plata

Under the Treaty, Portugal ceded Colonia del Sacramento, the associated island of San Gabriel and the Misiones Orientales while Spain acknowledged Portuguese control of Southern Brazil and returned Santa Catarina island. A Boundary Commission was established to delineate colonial borders between the Portuguese and Spanish Empires, which were later confirmed by the Treaty of El Pardo (1778). Portugal agreed to prevent the smuggling of goods and deny the use of its ports to military or commercial vessels from nations hostile to Spain. This was aimed at Britain, with whom Spain was at war from 1779 to 1783.

== Aftermath ==
Charles hoped settling the border would help the economic growth of the new viceroyalty and reduce unrest among its population. While partially successful, development was hampered by Spain's involvement in the American Revolutionary War (1779-1783) that restricted trade with mainland Spain and led to high tariffs and taxes to pay for it. The smuggling of duty-free goods remained a lucrative occupation, while heavy taxes and 'voluntary' donations caused unrest, such as the 1781 Revolt of the Comuneros in the Viceroyalty of New Granada.

Portugal regained the Misiones Orientales in the Treaty of Badajoz (1801). Spanish participation in the Napoleonic Wars and the loss of much of its navy at the Battle of Trafalgar in 1805 severed links between the central government and its restive colonies in the Americas. British assaults on Buenos Aires and Montevideo in 1806 and 1807 were repulsed by locally led forces, which gave them the confidence to demand self-rule. The Viceroyalty of Río de la Plata was dissolved during the 1810-1818 Argentine War of Independence. (Note: Spain lost control of the viceroyalty some years before its official dissolution, so the exact date is debated.)

The Misiones Orientales were the location of the Jesuit mission to the Guaraní people and the basis for the 1986 Robert De Niro film The Mission.

== See also ==
- List of treaties
- Spanish–Portuguese War (1776–77)
- Treaty of El Pardo (1778)
- Second Treaty of San Ildefonso
- Third Treaty of San Ildefonso

== Sources ==
- Marley, David (1998). Wars of the Americas: A Chronology of Armed Conflict in the Western Hemisphere (2008 ed.). ABC-CLIO. ISBN 1598841009.
- Moses, Bernard (1919). Spain's Declining Power in South America, 1730-1806 (2010 ed.). Cornell University Library. ISBN 1112594191.
- Owens, David (1993). "Spanish—Portuguese Territorial Rivalry in Colonial Río de la Plata". Yearbook (Conference of Latin Americanist Geographers). 19: 15–24. JSTOR 25765781.
- Paullin, Charles Oscar, Davenport, Frances Gardiner; European Treaties Bearing on the History of the United States and Its Dependencies; (Andesite Press, 2017 ed);
- Stein, Stanley; Stein, Barbara (2003). Apogee of Empire: Spain and New Spain in the Age of Charles III, 1759–1789. Johns Hopkins University Press. ISBN 0801873398.
