= Treaty of El Pardo (1778) =

1778 treaty between Spain and Portugal

Treaty of Friendship, Guaranty and Commerce between Spain and Portugal.
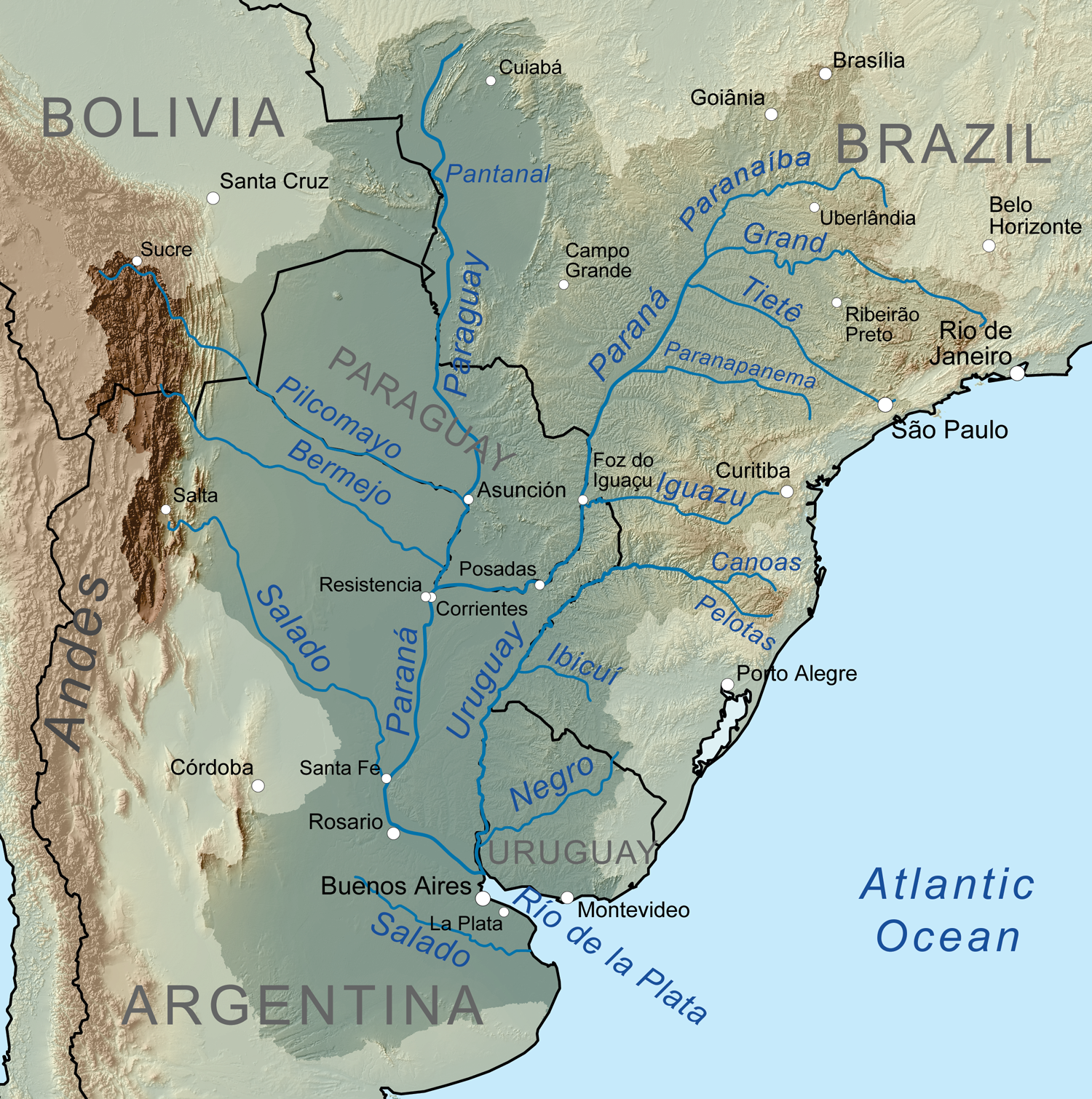
- The Río de la Plata basin, main area of dispute between Spain and Portugal
- Context: Spain and Portugal finalise boundaries in the Río de la Plata region, Spain gains territories in Equatorial Africa
- Signed: 11 March 1778
- Location: Royal Palace of El Pardo near Madrid
- Negotiators: (Spain) Count of Floridablanca; (Portugal) Francisco Inocencio de Souza Coutinho
- Parties: Portugal; Spain

The Treaty of El Pardo signed on 11 March 1778 sought to end conflict between Spain and Portugal in the Río de la Plata region, along the modern boundary between Argentina and Uruguay. It confirmed Spanish ownership of Colonia del Sacramento, now in Uruguay, while Portugal ceded possession of strategically important territories in Africa, now the modern state of Equatorial Guinea. In return, Spain withdrew from lands to the north, most of which are in the southern Brazilian state of Rio Grande do Sul.

== Background ==
For nearly 300 years, differing interpretations of the Treaty of Tordesillas led to border disputes between Spain and Portugal over the Río de la Plata region. Portuguese encroachments in this area allowed their merchants to evade commercial restrictions imposed by Spain on the importation of goods into Spanish South America. This culminated in 1680 when Portugal established the trading post of Colonia del Sacramento, just across the river from Buenos Aires which became a major centre for smuggled goods.

The two countries attempted to settle this dispute by the 1750 Treaty of Madrid but it was annulled by Charles III of Spain in 1761. Spain entered the Seven Years' War on the side of France in 1762; their invasion of Portugal ended in disaster, but they captured Colonia del Sacramento and lands now in the southern Brazilian state of Rio Grande do Sul. Although forced to return Colonia del Sacramento and other Portuguese possessions under Article XXI of the 1763 Treaty of Paris, Spain retained its gains in Rio Grande, since they argued these lands were in fact Spanish.

As a result, over the next decade Portugal reoccupied Rio Grande in an undeclared war before formal hostilities commenced in the 1776–1777 Spanish–Portuguese War. In February 1777, a Spanish expeditionary force of 116 ships and 19,000 troops captured the island of Santa Catarina in February before moving against Colonia del Sacramento which surrendered in July. Fighting ended in February 1777 when Joseph I of Portugal died and his daughter, Spanish-born Maria I, sued for peace. The October 1777 First Treaty of San Ildefonso established a Boundary Commission to demarcate borders in the Río de la Plata region, which were later confirmed by the Treaty of El Pardo.

== Provisions ==
The treaty confirmed the findings of the Boundary Commission; Portugal ceded Colonia del Sacramento to Spain, which in turn withdrew from lands to the north. It also included a number of commercial clauses, the most significant being the regulation of the tobacco and Atlantic slave trade. Spain regained bases for the West African slave trade it had relinquished in the 1479 Treaty of Alcáçovas, acquiring the Portuguese islands of Annobón and Bioko, or Fernão Pó, plus the mainland between the Niger River and the Ogoue River. These possessions were administered by the Spanish Viceroyalty of the Rio de la Plata, based in Buenos Aires. (Note: The viceroyalty included large parts of modern Argentina, Bolivia, Paraguay and Uruguay.)

== Aftermath ==
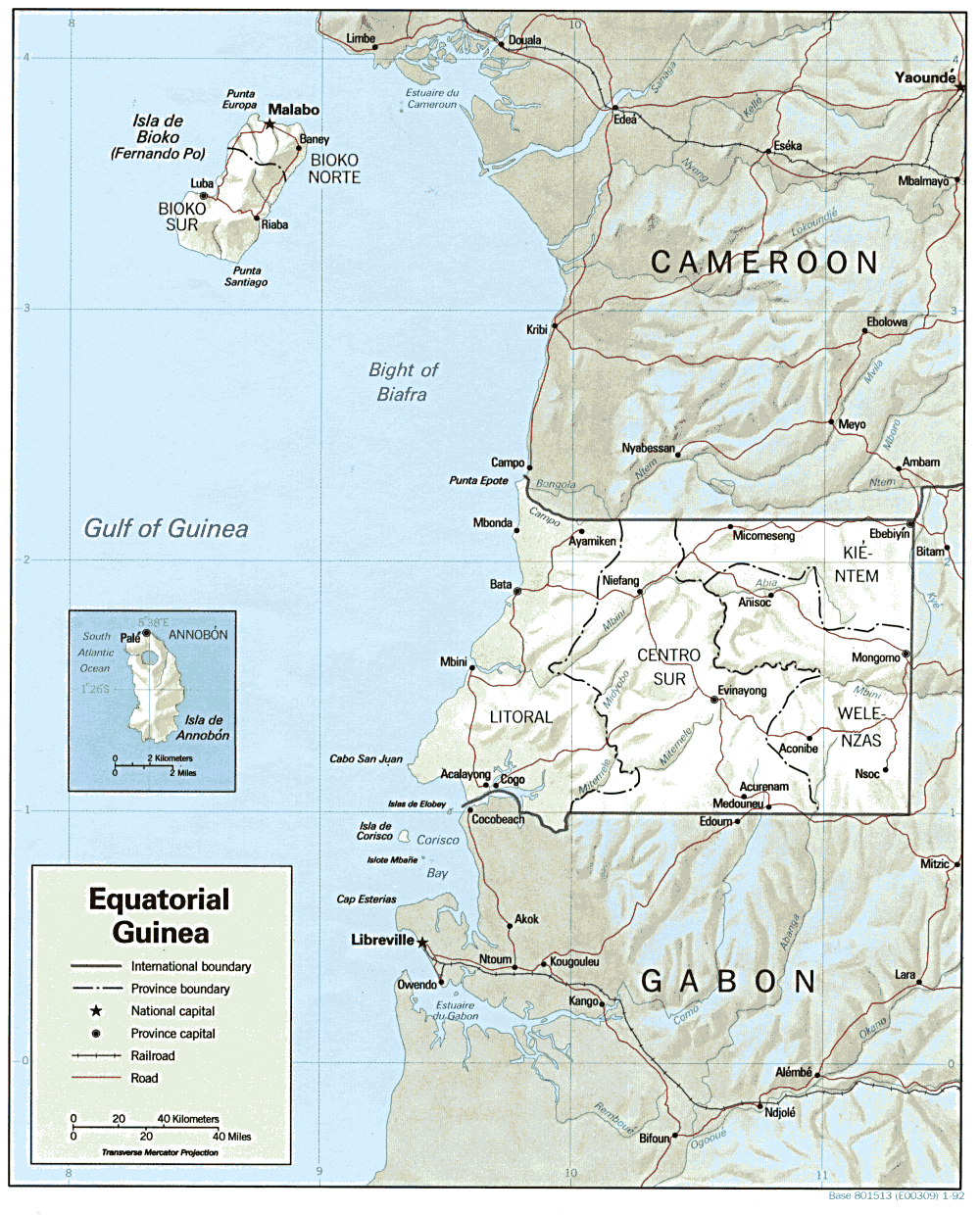
African territories ceded by Portugal, now Equatorial Guinea

Spanish hopes the border settlement would assist economic growth were hampered by the 1779–1783 war with Britain, which restricted trade with mainland Spain and led to high tariffs and taxes to pay for it.

Links between the Spanish central government and their overseas possessions were weakened during the Napoleonic Wars, while Portugal regained the Misiones Orientales in 1801, but despite this, the colonists successfully repulsed British invasions of the River Plate in 1806 and 1807. The Spanish American wars of independence between 1809 and 1829 resulted in the independence of Spanish colonies in the Americas, the Viceroyalty of Río de la Plata being dissolved during the 1810–1818 Argentine War of Independence. (Note: Spain lost control of the viceroyalty some years before it officially happened, so the exact date is debated.)

The African territories awarded to Spain under the Treaty of El Pardo became the colony of Spanish Guinea. Annobón and Bioko had been relatively neglected by the Portuguese, who had focused instead on São Tomé; with the gradual abolition of the transatlantic slave trade in the first half of the 19th century, these lost much of their value to Spain. In 1968, Spanish Guinea became the independent state of Equatorial Guinea.

== Sources ==
- Camogli, Pablo (2005). Batallas por la Libertad (in Spanish). Aguilar. ISBN 987-04-0105-8.
- Moses, Bernard (1919). Spain's Declining Power in South America, 1730-1806 (2010 ed.). Cornell University Library. ISBN 1112594191.
- Marley, David (1998). Wars of the Americas: A Chronology of Armed Conflict in the Western Hemisphere (2008 ed.). ABC-CLIO. ISBN 1598841009.
- Owens, David (1993). "Spanish—Portuguese Territorial Rivalry in Colonial Río de la Plata". Yearbook (Conference of Latin Americanist Geographers). 19: 15–24. JSTOR 25765781.
- Paquette, Gabriel (2014). Imperial Portugal in the Age of Atlantic Revolutions: The Luso-Brazilian World, 1770–1850. Cambridge University Press. ISBN 978-1107640764.
- Paullin, Charles Oscar; Davenport, Frances Gardiner (1917). European Treaties Bearing on the History of the United States and Its Dependencies (2017 ed.). Andesite Press. ISBN 1376158531.
- Sarmento, João (2016). Fortifications, Post-colonialism and Power: Ruins and Imperial Legacies. Routledge. ISBN 978-1138260672.
- Stein, Stanley; Stein, Barbara (2003). Apogee of Empire: Spain and New Spain in the Age of Charles III, 1759–1789. Johns Hopkins University Press. ISBN 0801873398.
