= Pacte de Famille =

Series of 3 alliances (1773, 1743, 1761) between the Bourbon kings of France and Spain

Both kingdoms (France & Spain) to the House of Bourbon

Foreign alliances of France

Frankish–Abbasid alliance
777–800s
Franco-Mongol alliance
1220–1316
Franco-Scottish alliance
1295–1560
Franco-Polish alliance
1524–1526
Franco-Hungarian alliance
1528–1552
Franco-Ottoman alliance
1536–1798
Franco-English alliance
1657–1660
Alliances with indigenous North Americans
1603–1763
Franco-British alliance
1716–1731
Franco-Spanish alliance
1733–1792; 1795–1808
Franco-Prussian alliance
1741–1756
Franco-Austrian alliance
1756–1792
Franco-Indian Alliances
1700s
Franco-Vietnamese
alliance
1777–1820
Franco-American alliance
1778–1794
Franco-Persian alliance
1807–1809
Franco-Prussian alliance
1812–1813
Franco-Austrian alliance
1812–1813
Franco-Russian alliance
1892–1917
Entente Cordiale
1904–present
Franco-Polish alliance
1921–1940
Franco-Italian alliance
1935
Franco-Soviet alliance
1936–1939
Treaty of Dunkirk
1947–1997
Western Union
1948–1954
North Atlantic Treaty
1949–present
Western European Union
1954–2011
European Defence Union
1993–present
Regional relations
- Asia
- Americas
- Africa

The Pacte de Famille (French pronunciation: [pakt də famij], Family Compact; Spanish: Pacto de Familia) is three separate, but similar alliances between the Bourbon kings of France and Spain. As part of the settlement of the War of the Spanish Succession that brought the House of Bourbon of France to the throne of Spain, Spain and France made a series of agreements that did not unite the two thrones, but did lead to cooperation and military alliance on a defined basis. The Bourbon alliance would be broken by the French Revolutionary Wars.

== The first Pacte de Famille, 1733 ==
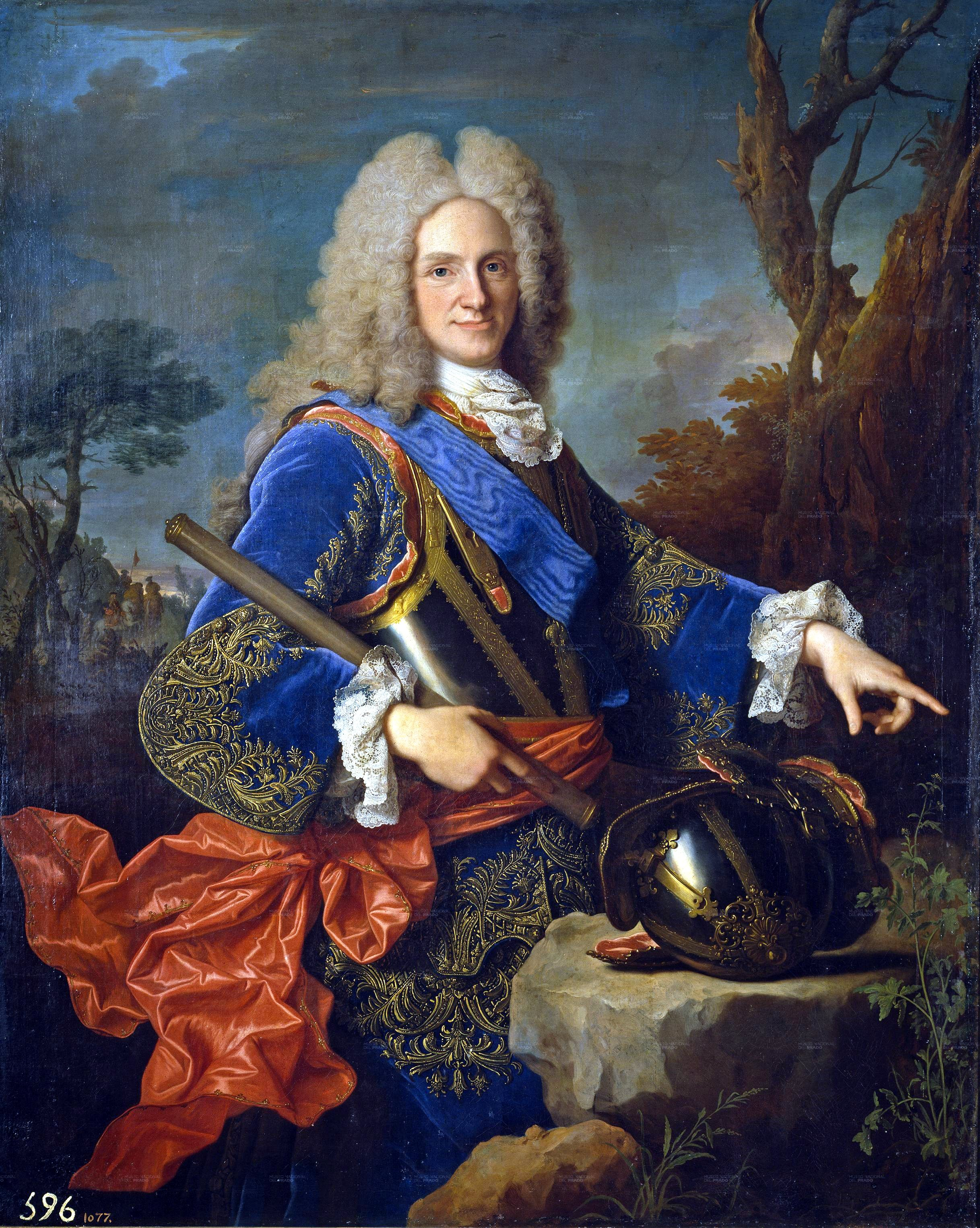
Philip V, first Bourbon king of Spain

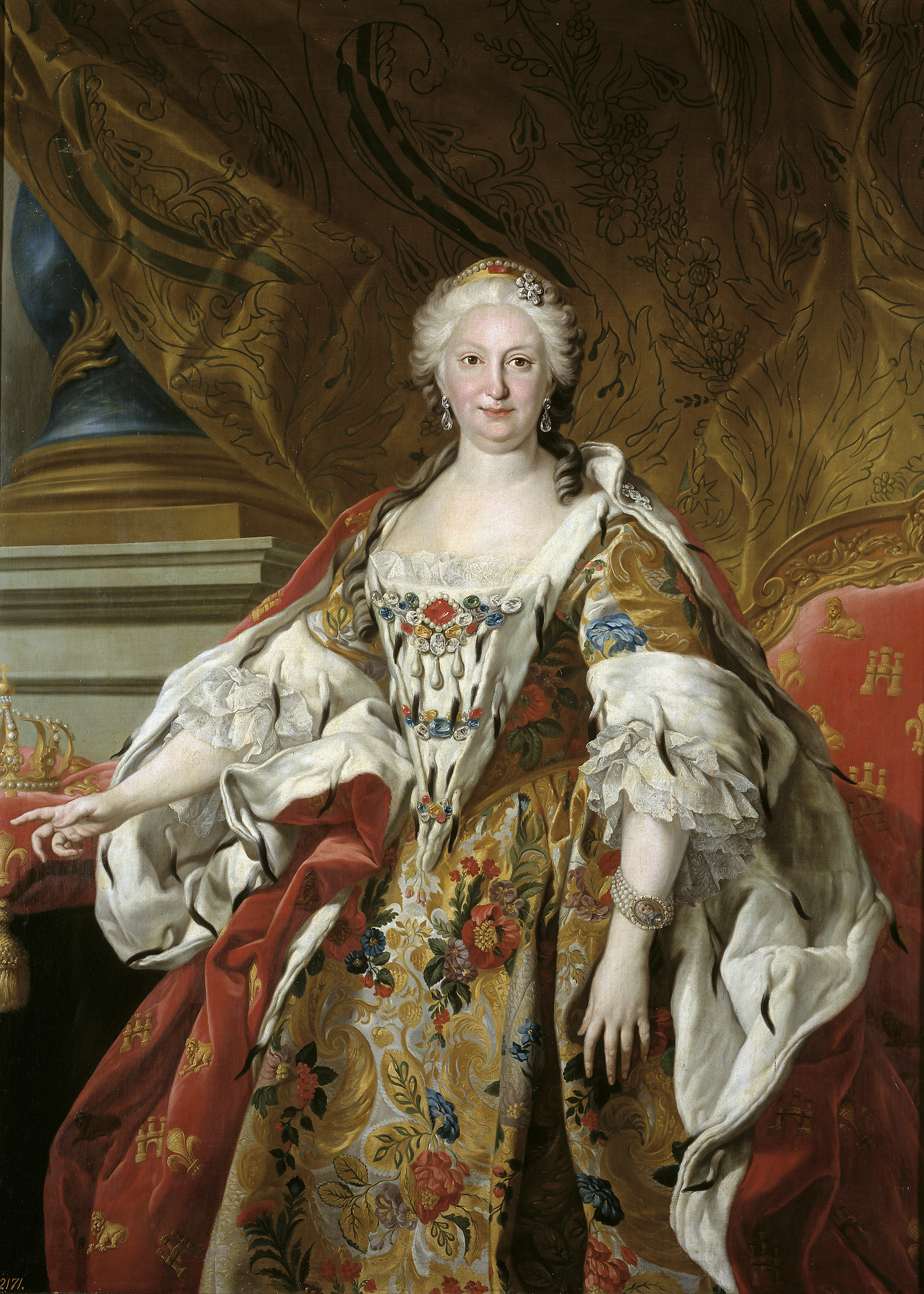
Elisabeth Farnese, Philip V's second wife, who exerted strong influence over her husband

The first of the three Pacto de Familia was agreed on November 7, 1733, between Philip V of Spain and his nephew Louis XV of France, in the Treaty of the Escorial.

The War of the Spanish Succession was fought to prevent a dynastic union of France and Spain; this meant despite their close family ties, the two countries were opponents in the 1718 to 1720 War of the Quadruple Alliance. When Cardinal Fleury became French chief minister in 1726, he sought a closer relationship with Spain. This was made easier by the birth of Louis' heir in 1729, which seemed to ensure the two would remain separate.

Louis's wife, Maria Leszczyńska, was the daughter of Stanisław Leszczyński, former King of Poland, deposed by Augustus II in 1709. After Augustus's death in February 1733, Louis saw an opportunity to weaken Austria by backing his father-in-law to regain the throne.

Philip, now married to his second wife, Elisabeth Farnese, wanted to regain Spanish territories in Naples and Sicily, ceded to Austria in 1714, in part so that Elisabeth's first-born son Charles, unlikely to succeed to the throne of Spain because he had two older half-brothers in line before him, would have territories to rule as king. Elisabeth Farnese had strong influence over her husband and tenaciously sought concessions from France that benefited Charles. Philip demanded that previous treaties affecting Italy would be abrogated and that a new treaty would cede Naples, Sicily, and the State of the Presidi to Spain for Charles's benefit. The Spanish negotiator with Fleury, José Patiño, was successful, leading to the signing of the First Family Pact. Charles received the future Italian possessions, Elisabeth Farnese retained her patrimonial rights in Italy. In the event that Spain's restriction of British trade was attacked in response, France pledged to come to its defense. France received important trading rights with Spain, whose overseas empire in Spanish America was the source of vast amounts of silver flowing to the world and a lucrative market. This led to their participation in the War of the Polish Succession in 1733.

In the treaty, France also agreed to help Spain retake Gibraltar, which was captured by Britain in the War of the Spanish Succession, while Spain agreed to end commercial concessions given to Britain in 1714 at the expense of France. Neither of these conditions were fulfilled at this point but the tensions would eventually lead to the War of Jenkins' Ear and the War of the Austrian Succession. Although Stanisław failed to regain the Polish throne, France acquired the strategic Duchy of Lorraine, while Philip won back Naples and Sicily for his son Charles.

== The second Pacte de Famille, 1743 ==
The second Family Compact was made on October 25, 1743, again by King Philip V of Spain and King Louis XV of France in the Treaty of Fontainebleau.

This pact was signed in the middle of the War of Austrian Succession, and many of its clauses had to do with the conduct of the war. Queen Elisabeth again sought Spain's expansion in Italy, this time to forward the interests of her second son, Philip. Spain sent two expeditions to Italy, and aided France in the conflict with Austria. Louis XV sought to tie Spain's interests closely to France's cause. Louis guaranteed the position of Charles as king of Naples and Sicily, install Philip as ruler of Milan, and remove the commercial constraints on Spain, following the treaty ending the War of the Spanish Succession. Spain gained from the agreement, as did France, and Britain felt the danger of a closer Bourbon alliance and increased French participation in the transatlantic trade. The result was the expansion of Spanish influence in Italy when Philip V's fourth son Philip, became in 1748 Duke of Parma, Piacenza and Guastalla.

== The third Pacte de Famille, 1761 ==
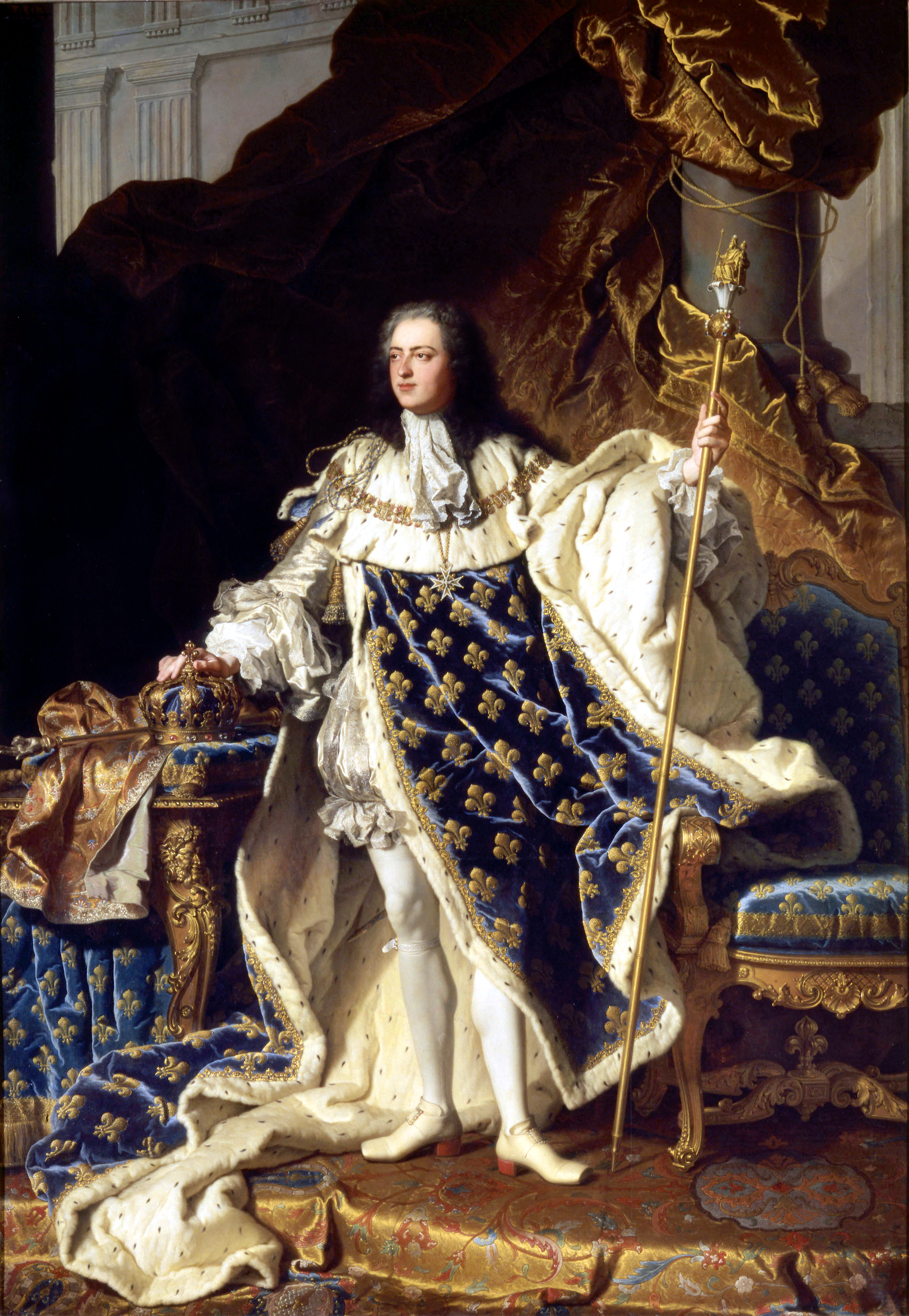
Louis XV of France

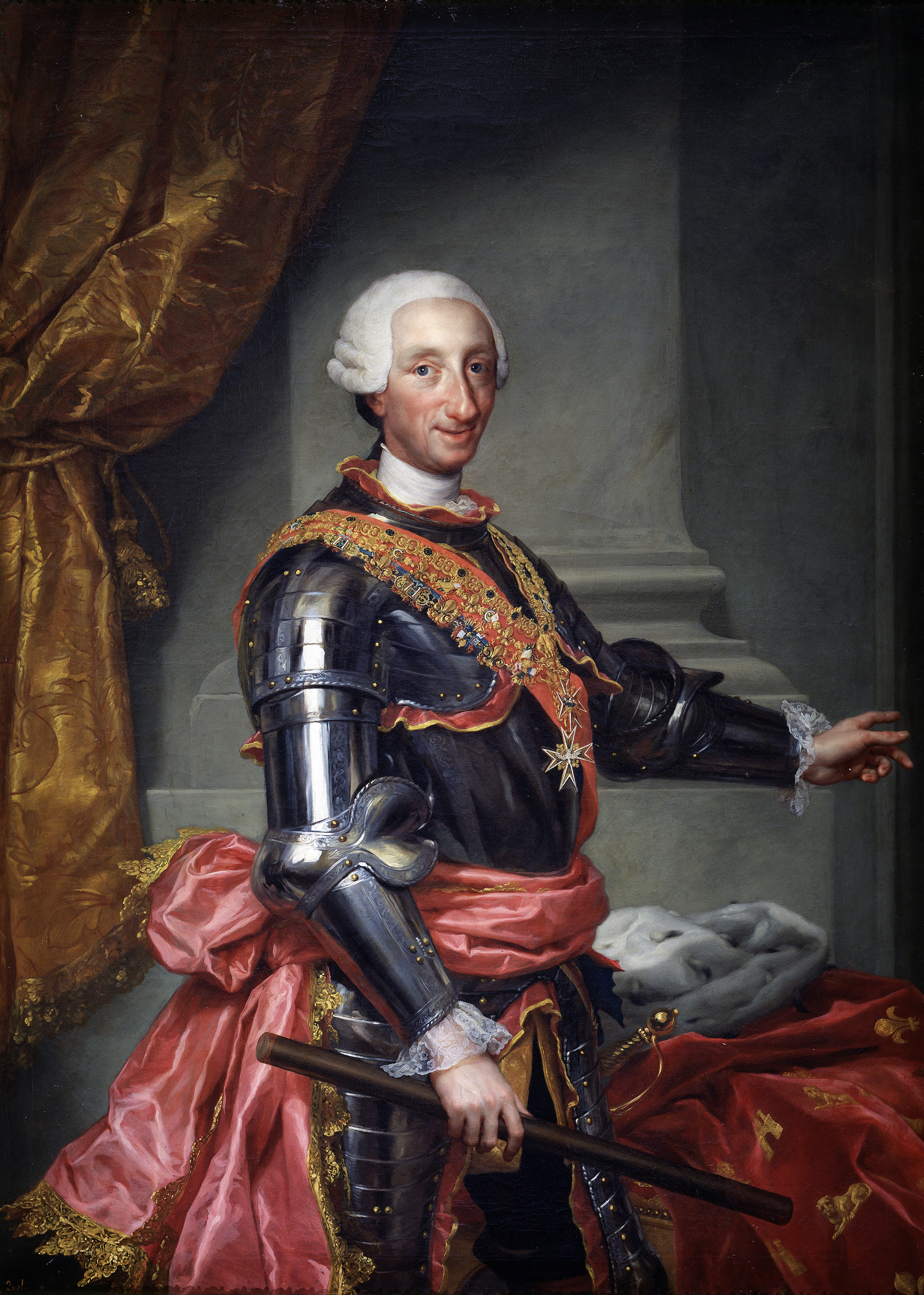
Charles III of Spain

The third Family Compact was made on 15 August 1761 by King Charles III of Spain and Louis XV in the Treaty of Paris, during the Seven Years' War, which had up to this point involved France but not Spain.

Charles III was the son of Philip V, making him Louis's first cousin. Charles's alliance reversed the policy of his predecessor, Ferdinand VI, who wished to keep Spain out of the war. With Ferdinand's death in August 1759 his half-brother Charles, the oldest son of Elisabeth Farnese, ascended to the Spanish throne. He had already ruled the kingdoms of Naples and Sicily for nearly twenty-five years. In 1742 during the War of the Austrian Succession, Ferdinand attempted to use his Sicilian domains to assist his Bourbon allies, but a Royal Navy fleet led by Commodore William Martin intervened to ensure his neutrality.

The Seven Years' War was going badly for the French, so the chief minister, Etienne François, duc de Choiseul pursued a dual track policy of attempting to bring Spain into a third pacte de famille or sue Britain and its allies for peace. Charles III was worried about the vulnerability of the overseas portion of his empire, and also worried that France would sell out Spain's interests in a peace with Britain. A formal alliance would prevent France concluding a peace unilaterally, so opted for the alliance with France, with the two Bourbon monarchies agreeing to settle the conflict with Britain in concert with each other. The pacte was to go into effect after the annual silver Spanish treasure fleet had arrived in Spain, signalling to the British that Spain intended on entering the conflict. The agreement involved Spain's allies, ruled by cadet branches of the Spanish Bourbons; Naples and Parma.

For Spain, the third Pacte was a complete disaster and did not bring much aid to the French. In 1762, the British captured two vital ports for trade in the Spanish Empire, Havana, Cuba and Manila, the Philippines. The British victories at Havana and Manila crippled Spanish transatlantic and transpacific routes. Worse was to follow from the alliance. Spain agreed to attack Britain's long-standing Iberian ally Portugal and thus invaded in 1762 with a large army. The Portuguese troops were supported by a sizeable British contingent and, in spite of three attempts, the Spanish along with their French ally were decisively defeated, losing in total upwards of 25,000 men. With the current war lost, France as compensation to Spain ceded the rest of Louisiana to Spain at the secret Treaty of Fontainebleau. At the Treaty of Paris the following year Charles III was able to regain Havana and Manila, but ceded all of strategically located Florida to the British.

== Later Franco-Spanish pacts ==
- On April 12, 1779, France and Spain signed the Treaty of Aranjuez (1779) by which Spain joined the Anglo-French War (1778–1783) against Great Britain for territory that the two had lost in the Seven Years' War at the Treaty of Paris and earlier at the Treaty of Utrecht (1713-15) for Spain to reacquire Gibraltar. (Note: For two-and-a-half years, active war by the Bourbon Kings Louis XVI and Carlos III against Britain (April 1779 to September 1782) overlapped the six-years-and-a-half years of British conflicts against the American revolutionaries (April 1775 to September 1781). Scholar Richard B. Morris notes that at Aranjuez, France broke its Treaty of Alliance (1778) from a year earlier with the Americans. The Bourbons agreed that if necessary, they would continue to maintain war against Britain after it granted American independence, so the French altered its American treaty Article 8 and Article 10 without consent from Congress.) This treaty was seen as a renewal of the third Pacte de Famille and so was not named the fourth Pacte de Famille.
- In August 1796, Manuel Godoy, first minister of Charles IV of Spain negotiated and signed the Second Treaty of San Ildefonso with France, which required Spain to declare war on Great Britain. This treaty can not be considered a Family Compact since all French Bourbons had either fled France or been executed or killed during the French Revolution.

== See also ==
- Precedence among European monarchies
