= Pedro de Cevallos =

Spanish military governor and viceroy (1715-1778)

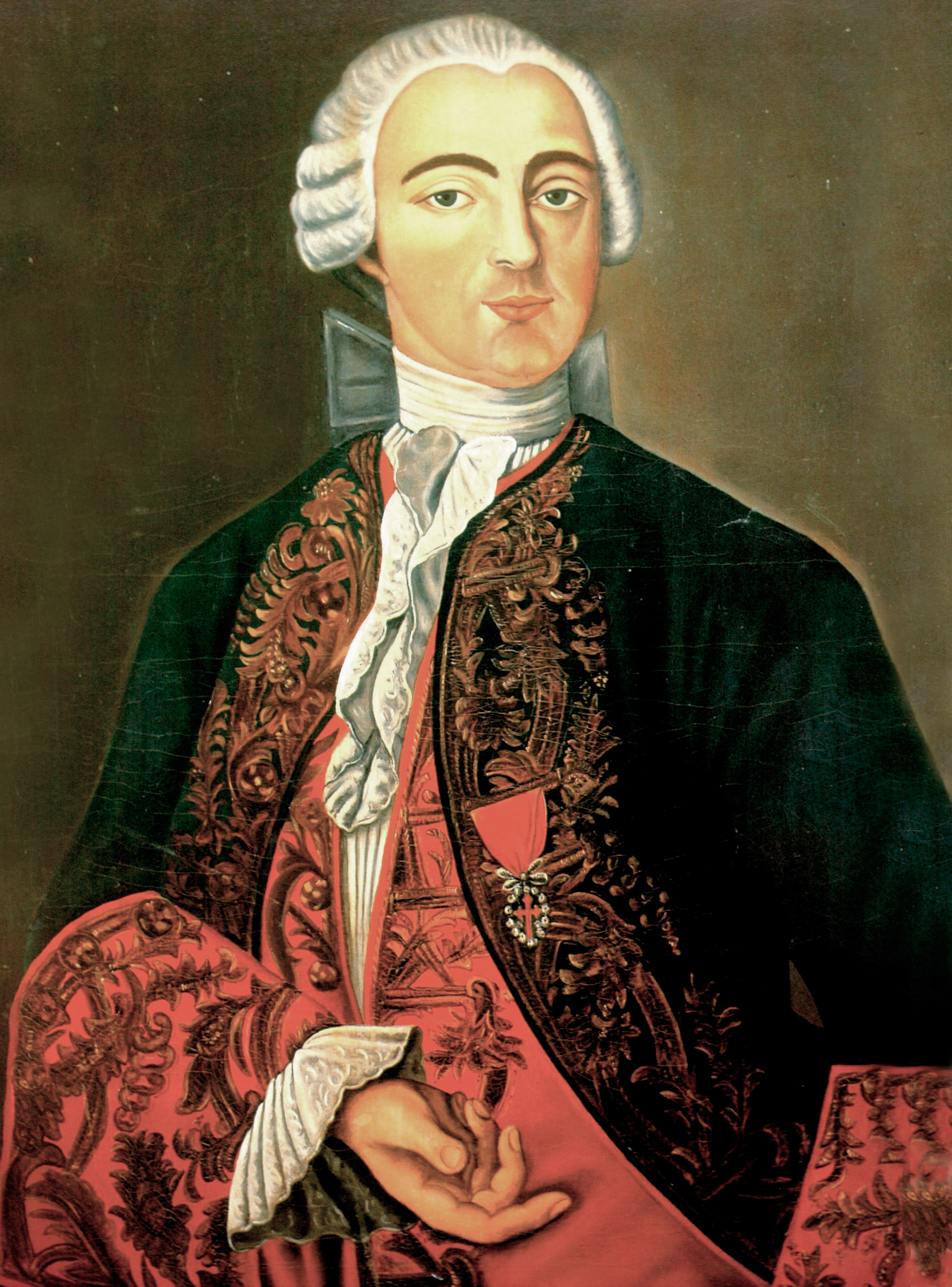
- Portrait of Pedro de Cevallos

1st Viceroy of the Viceroyalty of the Río de la Plata
- In office 1 August 1776 – 26 June 1778
- Monarch: Charles III of Spain
- First Secretary of State: Count of Floridablanca
- Secretary of State for Indies: Marquess of Sonora
- Succeeded by: Juan José de Vértiz y Salcedo

27th Governor of Río de la Plata
- In office 4 November 1756 – 15 August 1766
- Monarchs: Ferdinand VI; Charles III
- First Secretary of State: Ricardo Wall; Jerónimo Grimaldi
- Secretary of State for Indies: Julián de Arriaga y Ribera
- Viceroy of Peru: José Manso de Velasco
- Preceded by: José de Andonaegui
- Succeeded by: Francisco de Paula Bucareli

Personal details
- Born: Pedro Antonio de Cevallos Cortés y Calderón; 29 June 1715 Cádiz, Spain
- Died: 26 December 1778 (aged 63) Córdoba, Spain
- Occupation: Military

Military service
- Allegiance: Viceroyalty of the Río de la Plata
- Battles/wars: First Cevallos expedition, Second Cevallos expedition

Pedro Antonio de Cevallos Cortés y Calderón, also spelled Ceballos (29 June 1715 – 26 December 1778), was a Spanish military Governor of Buenos Aires between 1757 and 1766, and the first Viceroy of the Río de la Plata in 1776. He is best remembered for his highly competent and energetic organisation and command of Spanish military forces in two wars in South America.

== Early life ==
Pedro Antonio de Cevallos Cortés y Calderón was born in Cádiz, Spain, on 29 June 1715, to Juan Antonio Zeballos y Hollos and Juana María Cortés y Calderón. His father was a knight in the Order of Alcántara. Cevallos was orphaned at a young age and lived with his maternal grandparents in Don Benito. He received a military education at the Seminary of Nobles of Madrid.

== Career ==
=== Military and politics ===
Cevallos was attached to the Regiment of Order of Catalonia as a sublieutenant in 1730. He fought in the War of the Polish Succession and returned to Spain with the rank of captain. Using his own money, Cevallos organised his own regiment in 1741, and was appointed as its colonel by Philip V of Spain. He led this unit in Italy and was promoted to brigadier in April 1747. During his campaign in Italy he was appointed as governor of Nice and was promoted to field marshal.

Cevallos returned to Spain in 1749, and was given the encomiendas of Sagra and Senet. He was made governor of the Río de la Plata in November 1755, and led an expedition of 1,000 men to the area. He arrived in Buenos Aires in April 1756, and later made a base in São Borja. In 1759, he organised an expedition of 5,000 men against the natives of Gran Chaco. He handed over the position of governor to Francisco de Paula Bucareli on 15 August 1766.

The Portuguese settlement of Colonia del Sacramento was captured by Cevallos during the Seven Years' War, but Spain returned the settlement as part of the Treaty of Paris in 1763. Colonia del Sacramento was attacked and destroyed by an expedition led by Cevallos in 1776. Cevallos defeated the Portuguese near Santa Catarina in February 1779, ending Portuguese influence in Colonia del Sacramento.

Cevallos was sent to the royal courts of Paris and Parma in 1771. His success in these courts resulted in him being promoted to captain general of Extremadura in August 1772.

== Viceroy ==
A royal degree created the Viceroyalty of the Río de la Plata on 1 August 1776, and it was organised by Cevallos with Buenos Aires as its capital. Cevallos was the first viceroy of Río de la Plata. His 1776 expedition to Río de la Plata included 116 ships carrying 19,000 soldiers.

Miguel O'Gorman came to the viceroyalty with Cevallos and modernised medicine in the area. The number of bureaucrats in Buenos Aires rose from 14 in 1767, to 35 in 1778, and 83 in 1779. Most of the high-ranking bureaucrats were peninsulares.

Juan José de Vértiz y Salcedo succeeded Cevallos as viceroy.

== Personal life ==
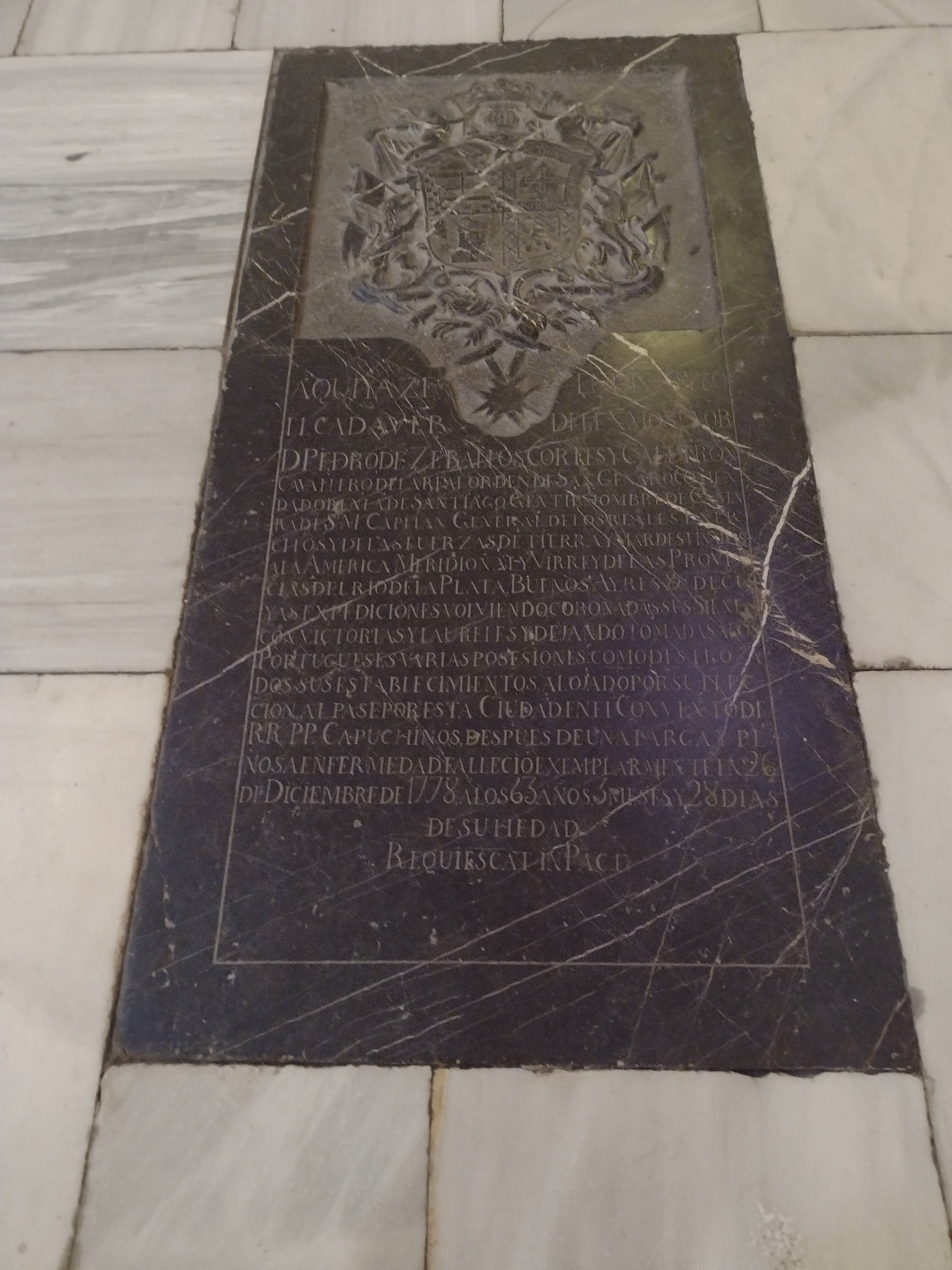
Tomb of Pedro de Cevallos

Cevallos was made a knight in the Order of Santiago in 1741.

María Luisa Pintos Ortega was Cevallos' mistress during his time as viceroy. Cevallos left to return to Spain, but died on Córdoba, Spain on 26 December 1778, while heading to Madrid. Ortega gave birth to a son, named Pedro Antonio after him, on 15 February 1779, eight months after Cevallos returned to Spain.

== Bibliography ==
- Abad de Santillán, Diego. Historia Argentina (in Spanish). Buenos Aires: TEA (Tipográfica Editora Argentina).

== Works cited ==
=== Books ===
- Fanning, Tim (2016). Paisanos: The Irish and the Liberation of Latin America. University of Notre Dame Press. ISBN 9780268104917.
- Murray, Claudia (2023). Colonial Urbanism in the Age of the Enlightenment: The Spanish Bourbon Reforms in the River Plate. Anthem Press. ISBN 9781785279812.
- Socolow, Susan (1987). The Bureaucrats of Buenos Aires, 1769-1810: Amor al Real Servicio. Duke University Press. ISBN 0822307537.

=== Web ===
- "Pedro de Cevallos (1715-1778)". Argentine Army. Archived from the original on 4 June 2007.

Government offices
Preceded by New creation	Viceroy of the Río de la Plata; 1776–1778	Succeeded by Juan José de Vértiz y Salcedo
