= 1725 =

1725 in various calendars
- Gregorian calendar: 1725; MDCCXXV
- Ab urbe condita: 2478
- Armenian calendar: 1174; ԹՎ ՌՃՀԴ
- Assyrian calendar: 6475
- Balinese saka calendar: 1646–1647
- Bengali calendar: 1131–1132
- Berber calendar: 2675
- British Regnal year: 11 Geo. 1 – 12 Geo. 1
- Buddhist calendar: 2269
- Burmese calendar: 1087
- Byzantine calendar: 7233–7234
- Chinese calendar: 甲辰年 (Wood Dragon); 4422 or 4215 — to — 乙巳年 (Wood Snake); 4423 or 4216
- Coptic calendar: 1441–1442
- Discordian calendar: 2891
- Ethiopian calendar: 1717–1718
- Hebrew calendar: 5485–5486
- Hindu calendars
- Vikram Samvat: 1781–1782
- Shaka Samvat: 1646–1647
- Kali Yuga: 4825–4826
- Holocene calendar: 11725
- Igbo calendar: 725–726
- Iranian calendar: 1103–1104
- Islamic calendar: 1137–1138
- Japanese calendar: Kyōhō 10 (享保１０年)
- Javanese calendar: 1649–1650
- Julian calendar: Gregorian minus 11 days
- Korean calendar: 4058
- Minguo calendar: 187 before ROC 民前187年
- Nanakshahi calendar: 257
- Thai solar calendar: 2267–2268
- Tibetan calendar: ཤིང་ཕོ་འབྲུག་ལོ་ (male Wood-Dragon); 1851 or 1470 or 698 — to — ཤིང་མོ་སྦྲུལ་ལོ་ (female Wood-Snake); 1852 or 1471 or 699

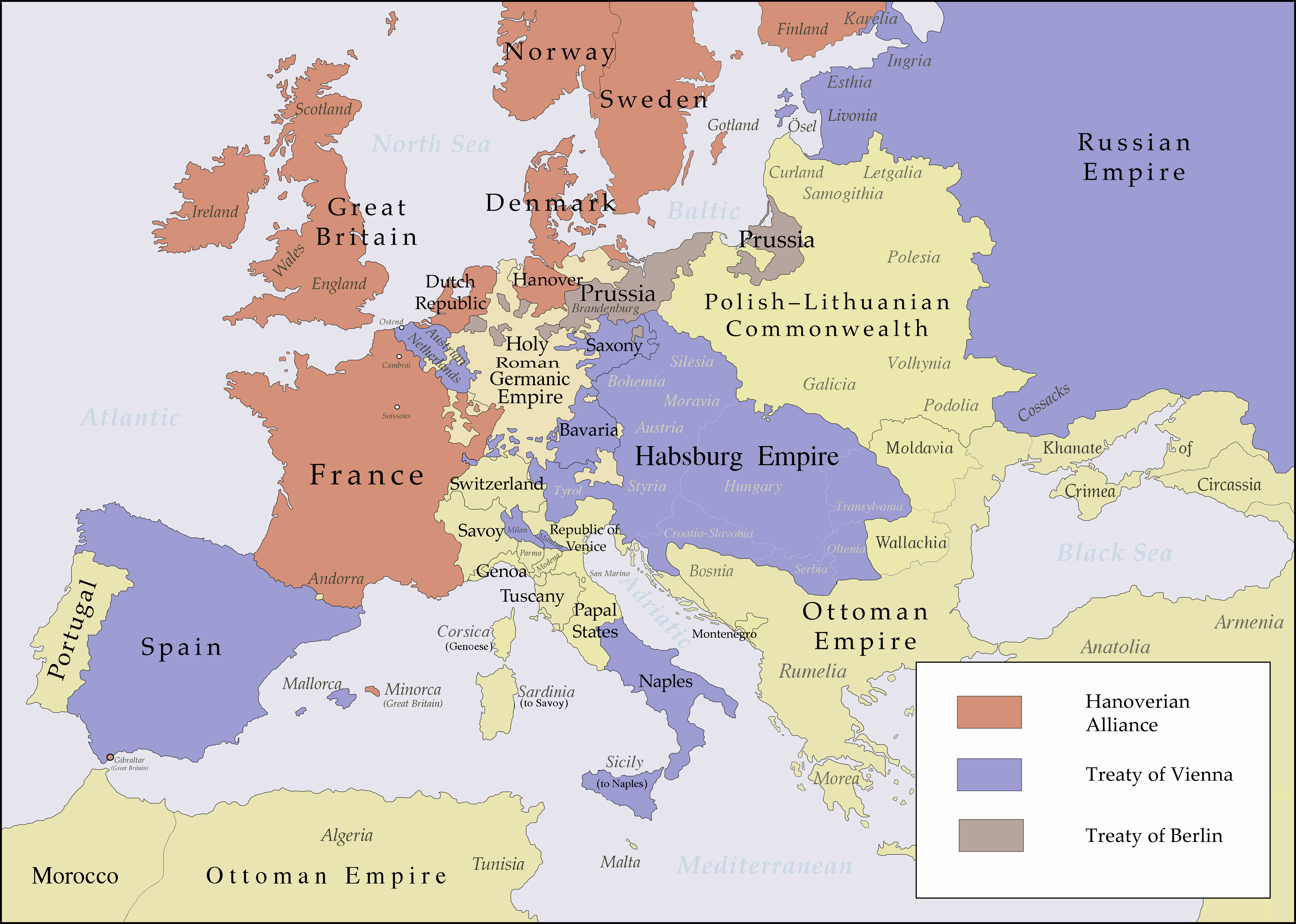
September 3: The Hanoverian Alliance (in red) is made between Great Britain, France, Prussia and the Electorate of Hanover after the April 30 formation of the Viennese Alliance (in blue) between Austria, Spain and the Holy Roman Empire.

1725 (MDCCXXV) was a common year starting on Monday of the Gregorian calendar and a common year starting on Friday of the Julian calendar, the 1725th year of the Common Era (CE) and Anno Domini (AD) designations, the 725th year of the 2nd millennium, the 25th year of the 18th century, and the 6th year of the 1720s decade. As of the start of 1725, the Gregorian calendar was 11 days ahead of the Julian calendar, which remained in localized use until 1923.

== Events ==
=== January–March ===
- January 1 – J. S. Bach leads the first performance of his chorale cantata Jesu, nun sei gepreiset, BWV 41, which features the trumpet fanfares from the beginning also in the end.
- January 6 – J. S. Bach leads the first performance of Liebster Immanuel, Herzog der Frommen, BWV 123, a chorale cantata for Epiphany.
- January 15 – James Macrae, a former captain of a freighter for the British East India Company, is hired by the Company to administer the Madras Presidency (at this time, the "Presidency of Fort St. George"), and begins major reforms. The area administered is most of Southern India, including what is now the Indian state of Andhra Pradesh, parts the states of Tamil Nadu, Kerala, Karnataka, Telangana, Odisha and the union territory of Lakshadweep.
- January 20 – James Figg hosts the first recorded international boxing match, fought between English livestock drover Bob Whitaker and Venetian gondolier Alberto di Carni in London.
- January 25 – The Spanish corsair Amaro Pargo receives the title of Hidalgo (nobleman).
- January – In Japan, the policy of the Gonin Gumi organizing groups of every five households in a town into units collectively responsible for the good behavior of everyone in the unit, goes into effect as the register of units is completed by the Tokugawa shogunate.
- February 2 – J. S. Bach leads the first performance of his chorale cantata Mit Fried und Freud ich fahr dahin, BWV 125, based on Luther's paraphrase of the Nunc dimittis.
- February 8 – (January 28 Old Style) Catherine I becomes Empress of Russia on the death of her husband, Peter the Great.
- February 20 – The first reported case of white men scalping Native Americans takes place in New Hampshire colony.
- February 23 – J. S. Bach leads his Tafel-Music Shepherd Cantata for the birthday of Christian, Duke of Saxe-Weissenfels.
- March 25 – Bach's chorale cantata Wie schön leuchtet der Morgenstern, BWV 1, is first performed on the Feast of the Annunciation, coinciding with Palm Sunday.
- March 30 – The second performance of Johann Sebastian Bach's St John Passion, BWV 245 (including 5 movements from his Weimarer Passion), takes place at St. Thomas Church, Leipzig.

=== April–June ===
- April 1 – J. S. Bach's later Easter Oratorio in its first version is performed at the Nikolaikirche in Leipzig on Easter Sunday.
- April 2 – J. S. Bach's cantata Bleib bei uns, denn es will Abend werden, BWV 6, is first performed in Leipzig on Easter Monday.
- April 30 – Charles VI, Holy Roman Emperor and King Philip V of Spain sign the Treaty of Vienna.
- May 12 – The Black Watch is raised as a military company, as part of the pacification of the Scottish Highlands under General George Wade.
- May 15 – Bach leads the first performance of his cantata Ich bin ein guter Hirt, BWV 85, about Jesus as the Good Shepherd.
- May 21 – On the day of the grand wedding of her daughter Anna to the Duke of Holstein-Gottorp, Empress Catherine I of Russia creates the Order of Saint Alexander Nevsky
- May 24 – Jonathan Wild, fraudulent 'Thief-Taker General', is hanged at Tyburn in London, for actually aiding criminals.
- June 23 – The Malt tax riots begin in Scotland in Hamilton, South Lanarkshire, after the price of beer and scotch whisky increases. Earlier in the year, the British government extended the taxes in England on malted grain to brewers and distilleries in Scotland. The rioting then spreads throughout Scottish counties.
- June 24 – The Grand Lodge of Ireland in Dublin holds its first recorded meeting, making it the second most senior Grand Lodge in world Freemasonry, and the oldest in continuous existence.

=== July–September ===
- July 8 – Mattheus de Haan becomes the new Governor-General of the Dutch East Indies (modern-day Indonesia), governing until his death on June 1, 1729 in Batavia (modern Jakarta).
- July 15 – Sir Richard Everard becomes the 4th Governor of North Carolina.
- August 15 – The civil marriage of King Louis XV of France and Princess Maria Leszczyńska of Poland is held at Strasbourg. The King is not present, and his cousin, the Duke of Orléans, serves as his proxy.
- August 19 – J. S. Bach leads the first performance of Lobe den Herren, den mächtigen König der Ehren, BWV 137, a cantata setting the unchanged text of Neander's hymn.
- August 27 – At least 216 people die in the sinking of the Chameau, a ship of the French Navy, after the vessel is driven by a storm into rocks off of the coast of Nova Scotia. Reportedly, 180 bodies wash ashore near Louisbourg. The ship's cargo, which included a fortune in gold and silver coins, is discovered 240 years later in 1965.
- September 5 – The day after they meet for the first time, the wedding ceremony of King Louis and Marie takes place in Fontainebleau, making her the Queen Consort of France. Their marriage lasts for almost 43 years until her death in 1768.
- September 16 – The Treaty of Hanover is signed between Great Britain, France and Prussia.

=== October–December ===
- October 19 – Joan Paul Schaghen is appointed by the Dutch East India Company to serve as the Governor of Ceylon after the death of Johannes Hertenberg.
- October 23 – Russia dispatches 1,500 troops and 120 civilians to Russia's border with China, on a mission to survey the boundaries in order to make a treaty with the Chinese Empire. Serbian adventurer Sava Vladislavich leads a group of cartographers to prepare maps in advance of traveling on to Beijing.
- November 5 – The fourth and final treaty of the 1725 Peace of Vienna is signed to create an alliance between Austria and Spain.
- November 8 – The first newspaper in the Province of New York, the New-York Gazette, is introduced by William Bradford as a weekly publication.
- November 22 – Chief Chicagou of the Mitchigamea tribe, and chiefs of five other tribes of the Illini Confederation, are received as guests of King Louis XV in Paris. Chicagou pledges the Illini's support of the French presence in North America.
- November 26 – British astronomers James Bradley and Samuel Molyneux set up a telescope in Molyneux's private observatory to begin their observations of stellar parallax of the star Gamma Draconis. The observations, which start on December 3, lead to Bradley's pioneering discovery of the aberration of light.
- December 12 – Johan Willem Ripperda of the Netherlands, the former Dutch Ambassador to Spain, arrives in Madrid and claims that King Philip V has appointed him as the new Prime Minister. The bluff is successful and he is granted authority by the King's advisers, but after four months, he is forced to resign.
- December 15 – A treaty is signed by chiefs of four member tribes of the Wabanaki Confederacy (the Abenaki, Pequawket, Mi'kmaq, Maliseet) and representatives of three British provinces in North America (Massachusetts Bay, New Hampshire and Nova Scotia) and their allies, the Mohawk nation, bringing an end to Dummer's War, named for acting Massachusetts Bay Governor William Dummer.
- December 25 – J. S. Bach leads the first performance of the Christmas cantata Unser Mund sei voll Lachens, BWV 110, making laughter audible in singing.

=== Date unknown ===
- The Terengganu Sultanate is established at Terengganu Darul Iman (in modern Malaysia).
- A fire in Wapping, London, destroys 70 houses.
- In Qing dynasty China, 66 copies of a 5,020 volume-long encyclopedia, the Complete Classics Collection of Ancient China are printed, necessitating the crafting of 250,000 movable type characters cast in bronze.
- Freemasonry is established in France, as an English import.
- The Four Seasons, a set of violin concertos by Antonio Vivaldi, is published.
- Gradus ad Parnassum, a seminal work on counterpoint, laying out rules of constructing music, is published by Johann Joseph Fux.

== Births ==
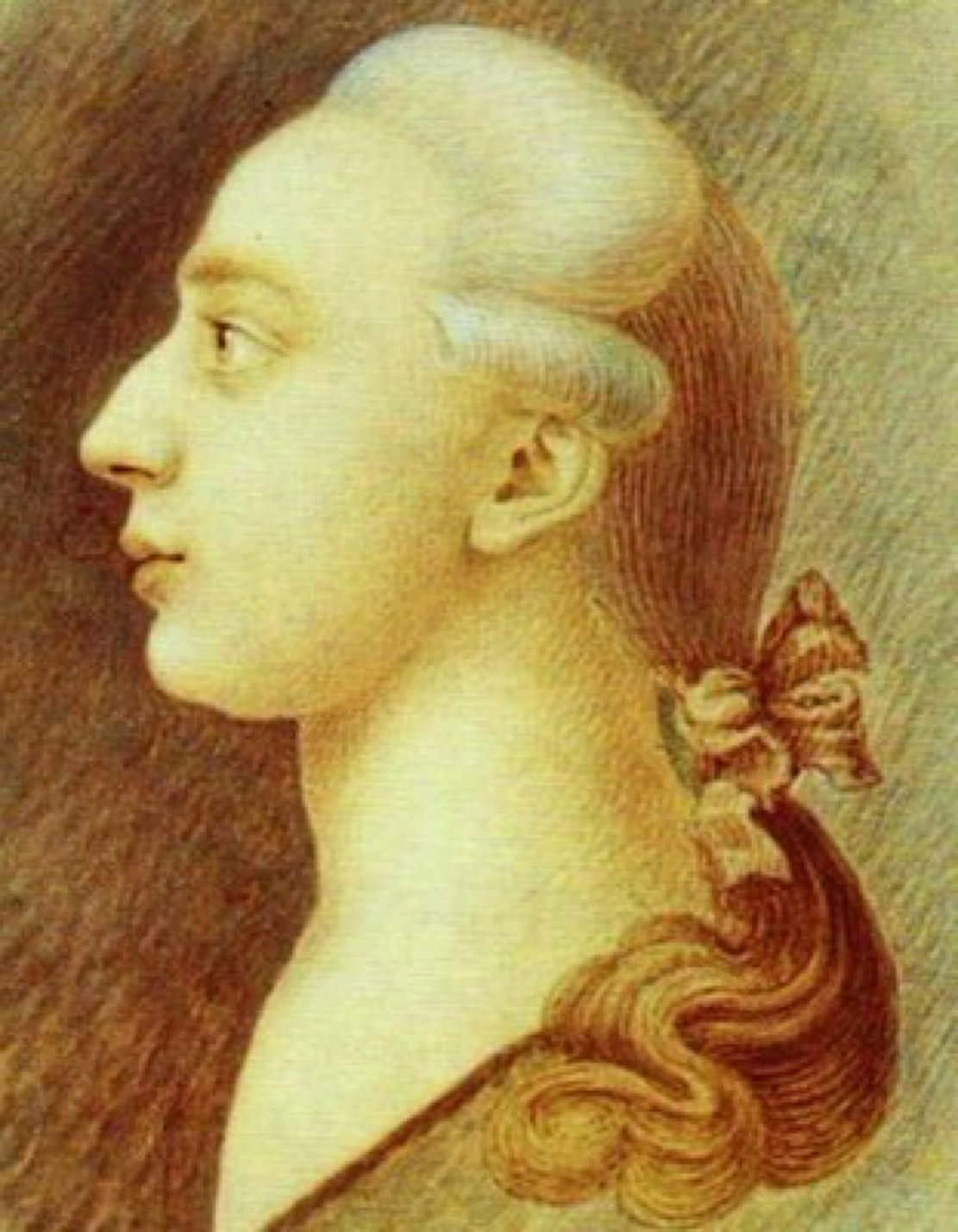
Giacomo Casanova

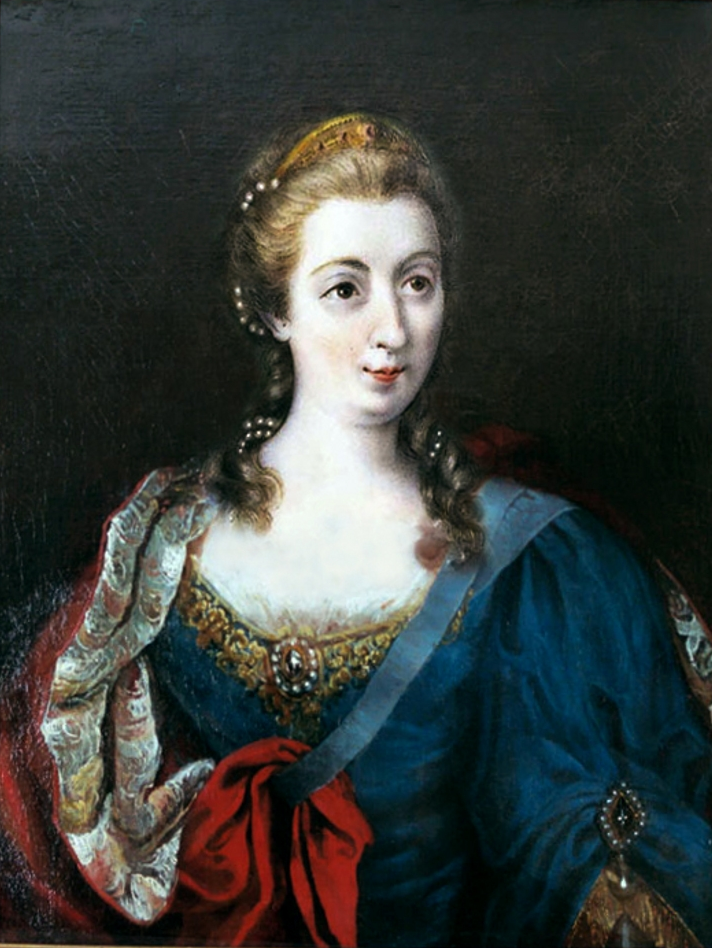
Maria Teresa Cybo-Malaspina, Duchess of Massa

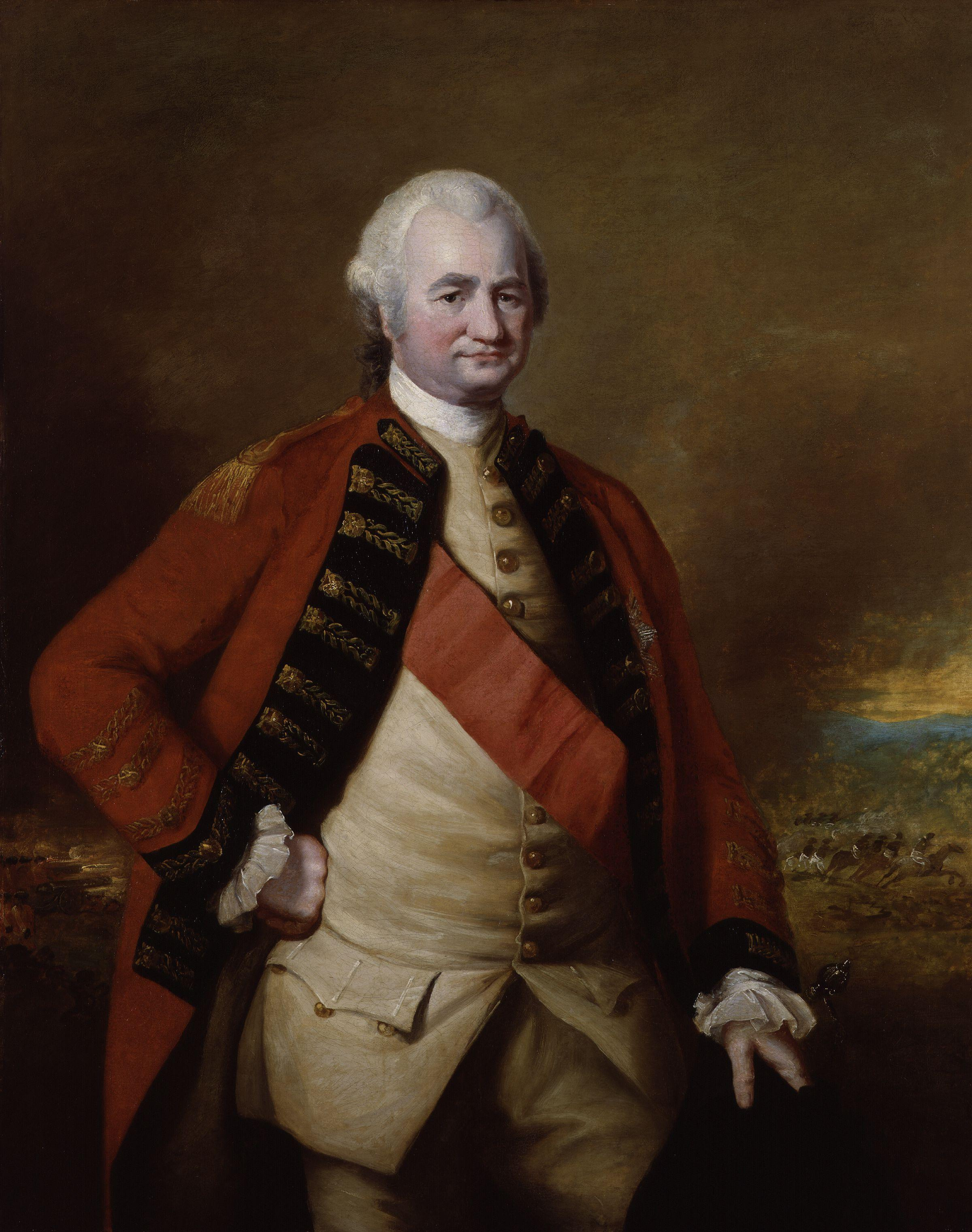
Robert Clive

- January 25 – Antoine Court de Gébelin, French pastor (d. 1784)
- February 4 – Dru Drury, English entomologist (d. 1803)
- February 5
  - James Otis, American lawyer, patriot (d. 1783)
  - Anna Maria Rückerschöld, Swedish author (d. 1805)
- February 15 – Abraham Clark, American signer of the Declaration of Independence (d. 1794)
- February 25 – Karl Wilhelm Ramler, German poet (d. 1798)
- February 26 – Nicolas-Joseph Cugnot, French steam vehicle pioneer (d. 1804)
- March 6 – Henry Benedict Stuart, Italian-born cardinal, Jacobite claimant to the British throne (d. 1807)
- March 17 – Lachlan McIntosh, Scottish-born American military and political leader (d. 1806)
- March 20 – Abdul Hamid I, Ottoman Sultan (d. 1789)
- March 24
  - Samuel Ashe, Governor of North Carolina (d. 1813)
  - Thomas Cushing, American Continental Congressman (d. 1788)
- March 28 – Andrew Kippis, English non-conformist clergyman, biographer (d. 1795)
- April 2 – Giacomo Casanova, Italian adventurer, writer (d. 1798)
- April 6 – Pasquale Paoli, Corsican patriot, military leader (d. 1807)
- April 23 – Gerard Majella, Italian Catholic lay brother and saint (d. 1755)
- April 25 – Augustus Keppel, 1st Viscount Keppel, British admiral (d. 1786)
- May 4 – Johan August Meijerfeldt the Younger, Swedish field marshal (d. 1800)
- May 12 – Louis Philippe I, Duke of Orléans, French soldier, writer (d. 1785)
- May 25 – Samuel Ward, American politician (d. 1776)
- June 29 – Maria Teresa Cybo-Malaspina, Duchess of Massa, Italian ruler (d. 1790)
- July 1 – Rhoda Delaval, English portrait painter (d. 1757)
- July 4
  - Jean-Baptiste Luton Durival, French historian, diplomat and Encyclopédiste (d. 1810)
  - Jean-Baptiste Donatien de Vimeur, comte de Rochambeau, French soldier (d. 1807)
- July 24 – John Newton, English cleric and hymnist (d. 1807)
- August 21 – Jean-Baptiste Greuze, French painter (d. 1805)
- August 29 – Charles Townshend, English politician (d. 1767)
- September 5 – Jean-Étienne Montucla, French mathematician (d. 1799)
- September 12 – Guillaume Le Gentil, French astronomer (d. 1792)
- September 16
  - Nicolas Desmarest, French geologist (d. 1815)
  - Anna Barbara Gignoux, German industrialist (d. 1796)
- September 24 – Arthur Guinness, Irish brewer (d. 1803)
- September 29 – Robert Clive, British general, statesman (d. 1774)
- October 12 – Étienne Louis Geoffroy, French pharmacist, entomologist (d. 1810)
- October 21 – Franz Moritz Graf von Lacy, Austrian field marshal (d. 1801)
- December 11 – George Mason, American founding father (d. 1792)
- December 18 – Johann Salomo Semler, German historian, Bible commentator (d. 1791)
- December 23 – Ahmad Shah Bahadur, 14th Mughal Emperor (d. 1775)
- date unknown – Magdalena Dávalos y Maldonado, Ecuadorian scholar, socialite (d. 1806)

== Deaths ==
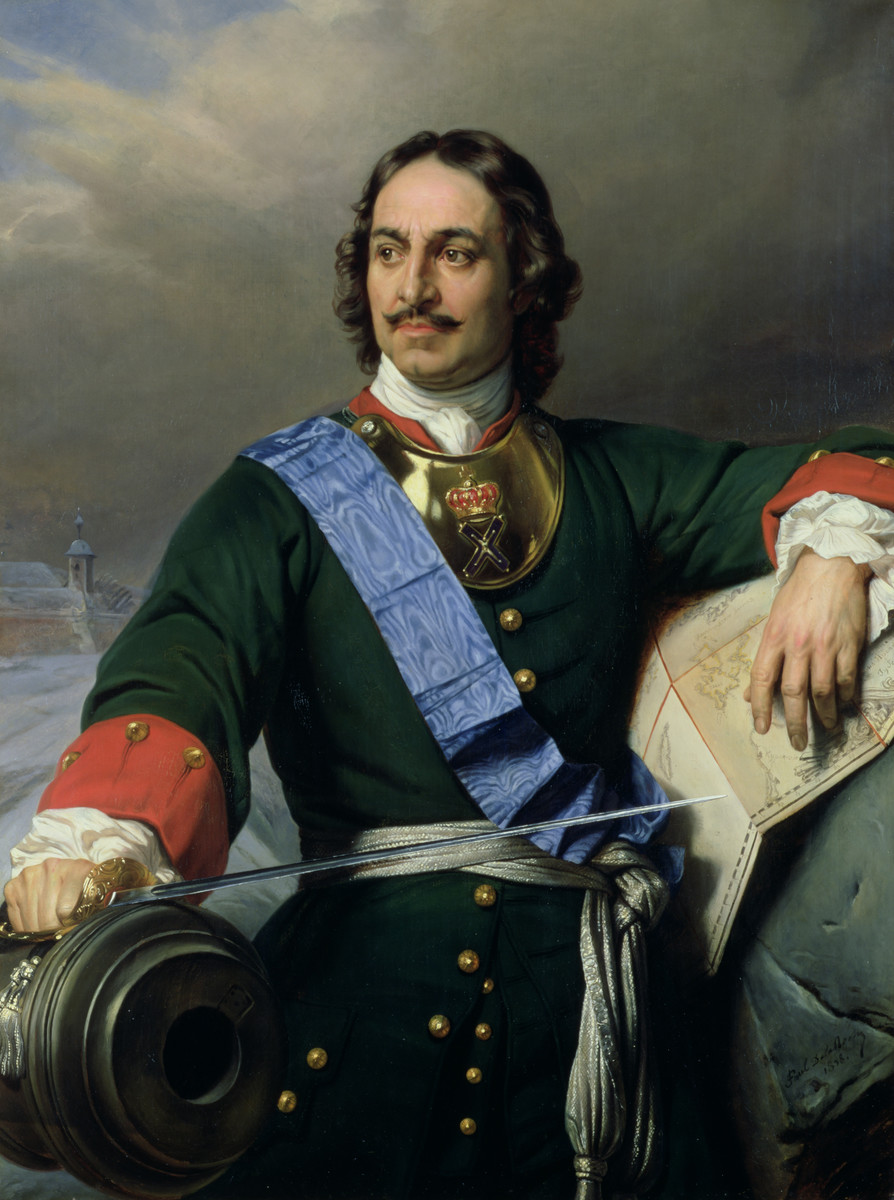
Emperor Peter I of Russia

Jonathan Wild

- January 6 – Chikamatsu Monzaemon, Japanese dramatist (b. 1653)
- January 26 – Sulkhan-Saba Orbeliani, Georgian prince (b. 1658)
- January 29 – Nuno Álvares Pereira de Melo, 1st Duke of Cadaval, Portuguese nobleman and statesman (b. 1638)
- February 7 – Johann Philipp Krieger, German Baroque composer (b. 1649)
- February 8 – Emperor Peter I of Russia (b. 1672)
- March 2 – José Benito de Churriguera, Spanish architect, sculptor (b. 1665)
- March 10 – John Conyers, English politician (b. 1650)
- March 30 – René de Froulay de Tessé, French Marshal and diplomat (b. 1648)
- April 8 – John Wise, English clergyman (b. 1652)
- April 12 – Giovanni Battista Foggini, Italian artist (b. 1652)
- April 25 – Paul de Rapin, French historian (b. 1661)
- May 22 – Robert Molesworth, 1st Viscount Molesworth, Irish politician (b. 1656)
- May 24 – Jonathan Wild, English criminal (b. 1682)
- May 31 – Erik Carlsson Sjöblad, Swedish governor, admiral, and baron (b. 1647)
- June 29
  - Arai Hakuseki, Japanese poet, politician, and writer (b. 1657)
  - Juan Manuel Fernández Pacheco, 8th Duke of Escalona, Spanish aristocrat (b. 1650)
- July 11 – Salomon Franck, German lawyer, scientist, poet (b. 1659)
- July 17 – Thomas King, English and British soldier, MP for Queenborough, lieutenant-governor of Sheerness (b. before 1660?)
- September 16 – Antoine V de Gramont, French military leader (b. 1672)
- October 10
  - Francesco del Giudice, Italian Catholic cardinal (b. 1647)
  - Philippe de Rigaud Vaudreuil, Governor-General of New France (b. c. 1643)
- October 11 – Hans Herr, Swiss-born Mennonite bishop (b. 1639)
- October 16 – Ralph Thoresby, British historian (b. 1658)
- October 24 – Alessandro Scarlatti, Italian composer (b. 1660)
- November 20 – William, Landgrave of Hesse-Rotenburg (from 1683) (b. 1648)
- December 7 – Florent Carton Dancourt, French dramatist, actor (b. 1661)
- December 10 – Nicolaas Hartsoeker, Dutch mathematician and physicist (b. 1656)
- date unknown
  - Giuseppe Mazzuoli, Italian sculptor (b. 1644)
  - José Mora, Spanish sculptor (b. 1638)
  - Nguyễn Phúc Chu, Vietnamese ruler (b. 1675)
  - Petar Blagojević, Serbian peasant, alleged vampire
  - Alicia D'Anvers, English poet (b. 1688)
- probable
  - Leendert Hasenbosch, Dutch castaway on Ascension Island (b. c. 1695)
  - Keaweʻīkekahialiʻiokamoku, ruler of Hawaii (b. c. 1660)
