= Anglo-Austrian Alliance =

Military alliance between Great Britain and Austria (1731–1756)

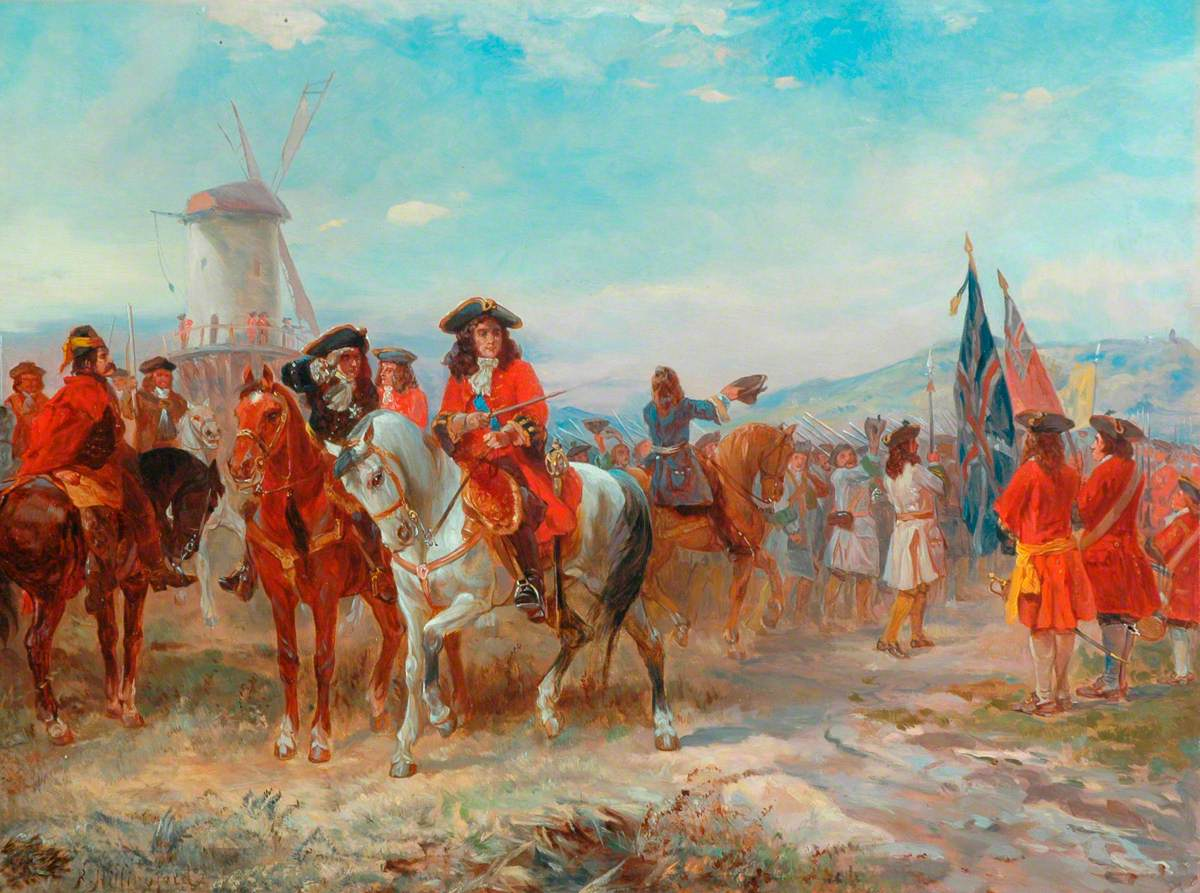
The Duke of Marlborough with Prince Eugene of Savoy at the Battle of Blenheim. In the conflict, Britain and Austria fought as allies.

The Anglo-Austrian Alliance connected the Kingdom of Great Britain and the Habsburg monarchy during the first half of the 18th century. It was largely the work of the British Whig statesman Thomas Pelham-Holles, 1st Duke of Newcastle, who considered an alliance with Austria crucial to prevent the further expansion of French power.

It lasted from 1731 to 1756 and formed part of the stately quadrille by which the Great Powers of Europe continually shifted their alliances to try to maintain the balance of power in Europe. Its collapse during the Diplomatic Revolution ultimately led to the Seven Years' War.

== Background ==
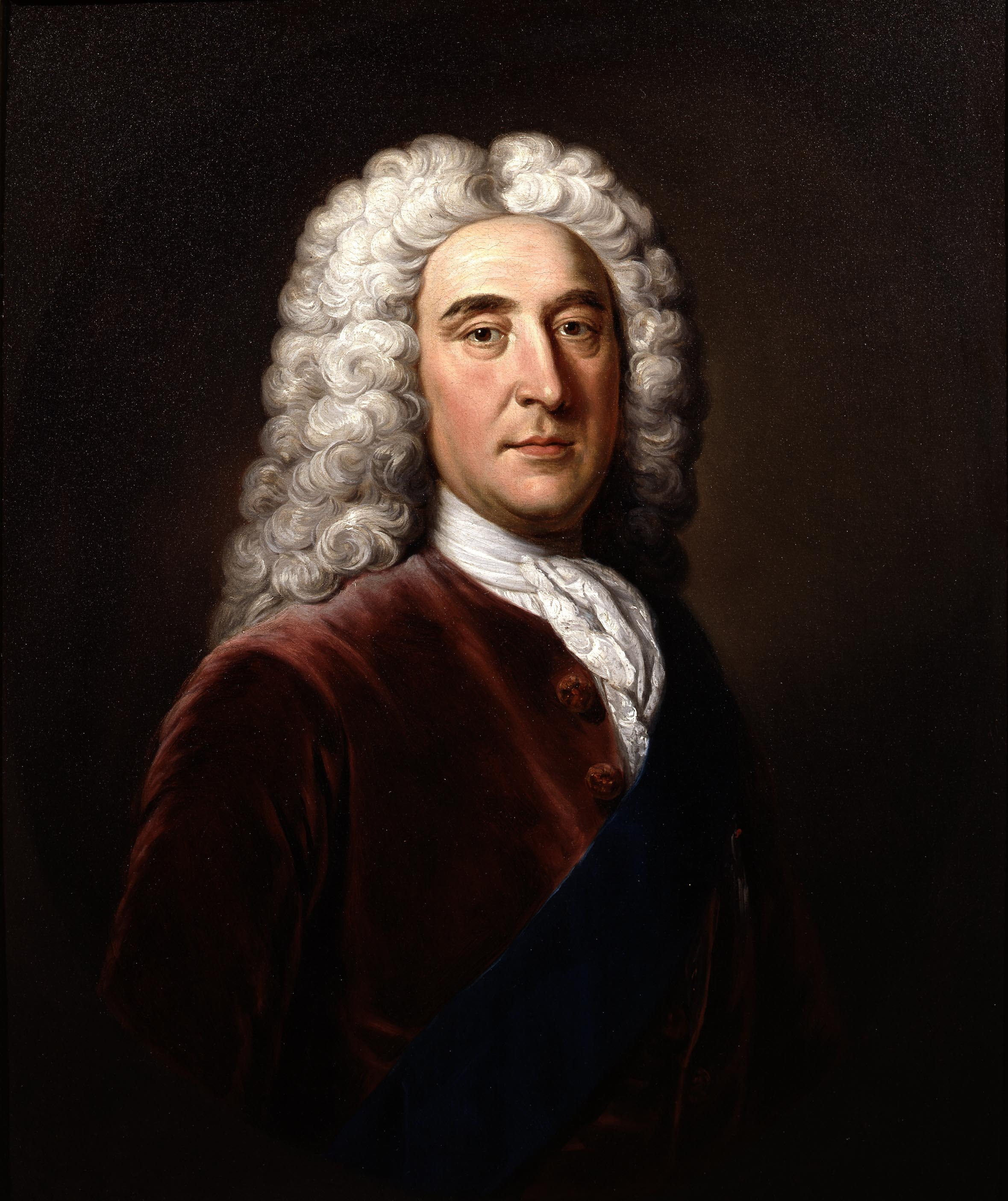
The Duke of Newcastle was a prominent Austrophile and one of the architects of the Anglo-Austrian Alliance.

In 1725 Austria had signed the Treaty of Vienna, offering material support to the Spanish in their efforts to try to recapture Gibraltar from the British. Britain was then allied to France, but the relationship was slowly declining, and by 1731, they would be considered enemies again. When, in 1727, the Spanish mounted the Thirteenth siege of Gibraltar during the Anglo-Spanish War, British diplomats persuaded the Austrians not to assist the Spanish by offering a number of concessions. A humiliated Spain was forced to break off the siege and make peace.

A number of prominent Austrophiles had for some time been advocating a British alliance with Austria, as Austria was seen as the only country with land forces that could match the French on the Continent. Austrophiles received a boost when the greatest opponent of Austria, Lord Townshend was forced to resign from office in 1730. That cleared the way for a full rapprochement between London and Vienna and gave the Duke of Newcastle more control over British foreign policy. He was strongly convinced that an alliance with Austria was essential.

== Alliance ==
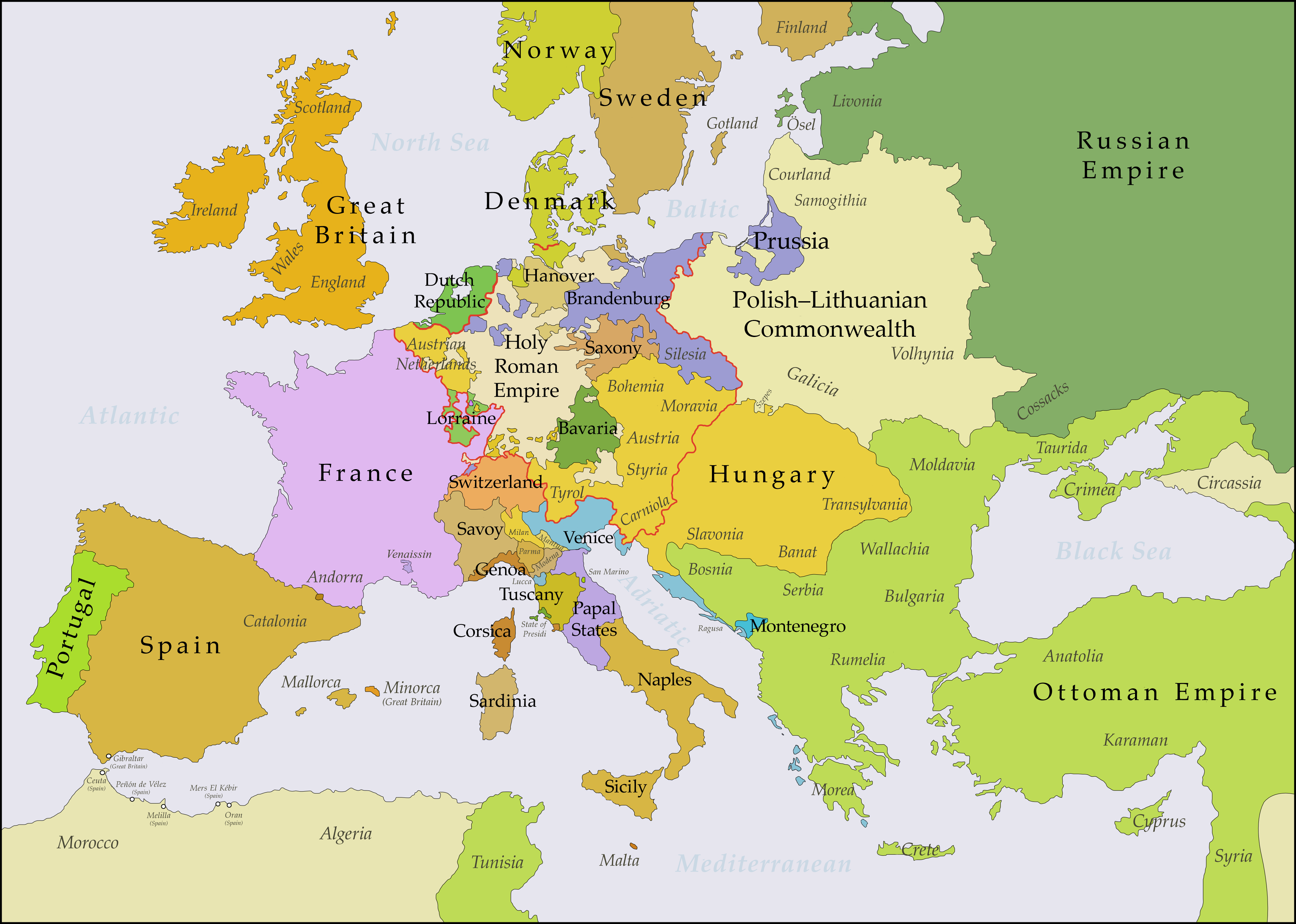
Europe in the years after the 1748 Treaty of Aix-la-Chapelle.

In 1727, the Austrians had agreed to suspend the Ostend Company, whose overseas trading had been a constant source of tension with the British. That laid the groundwork for the Treaty of Vienna, which instituted a formal alliance between the two powers. It was signed on 16 March 1731 by Prince Eugene of Savoy, Count Sinzendorf, Count Starhemberg and the British envoy the Earl of Chesterfield. One immediate result was the complete disbandment of the Ostend Company, which delighted the British government. Britain and Austria gave each other a reciprocal guarantee against aggression.

The Austrians therefore expected British support in the War of the Polish Succession, however this was not forthcoming as the British government considered the war to be one of aggression against the legitimately elected Polish king, Stanisław I Leszczyński. This strained the alliance considerably, but convergence of interests in the next war led to the revival of ties.

The British gave material support to the Austrians in the War of the Austrian Succession in the form of British troops and providing large financial subsidies that allowed Maria Theresa to secure the Austrian throne, in defiance of Salic Law. By 1745, Austria had appeared to be in serious danger of being completely overrun and partitioned by Prussia and France, but a British campaign against the French in Flanders drew away crucial French manpower, allowing the Austrians to counterattack.

The British had also applied diplomatic pressure to persuade Prussia's Frederick the Great to agree a ceasefire at the Treaty of Dresden so that Austria could turn its full attention against the French.

The Alliance was sometimes severely strained. The Austrians believed the British had done little to prevent France from occupying Brussels in 1746, which led to a further increase of conflicts.

The worst was during the Congress of Breda, aimed at negotiating an end to the war and leading to the eventual settlement at Aix-la-Chapelle in 1748. The British, hoping for a swift conclusion, were annoyed by Austria's slow progress in agreeing the terms. They eventually threatened to sign the treaty alone if Austria did not agree to it within three weeks.

Austria reluctantly signed the treaty. It was particularly disturbed to have little material gains for their efforts in the war, but the British considered the terms offered by the French to be very generous.

However, the omens looked good for the alliance. The Austrians had an enthusiastic supporter in Newcastle, Whig politician Thomas Pelham-Holles, and apparently had no other major ally to turn to. The British regarded the alliance as part of the Newcastle System to maintain the security of Germany by creating an alliance between Britain, Hanover, Austria and the Dutch Republic.

== Collapse ==
In Austria, there remained some nagging suspicion that the British were not fully committed to the alliance. Britain's absence from the War of the Polish Succession and its failure to insist on a return of Silesia to Austria at the Treaty of Aix-la-Chapelle were highlighted as signs of Britain's bad faith. Essentially, it was believed that Britain was interested in the alliance only when it suited its own goals. One of the leading anti-British influences was Wenzel Anton Graf Kaunitz, who became Minister for Foreign Affairs in 1753.

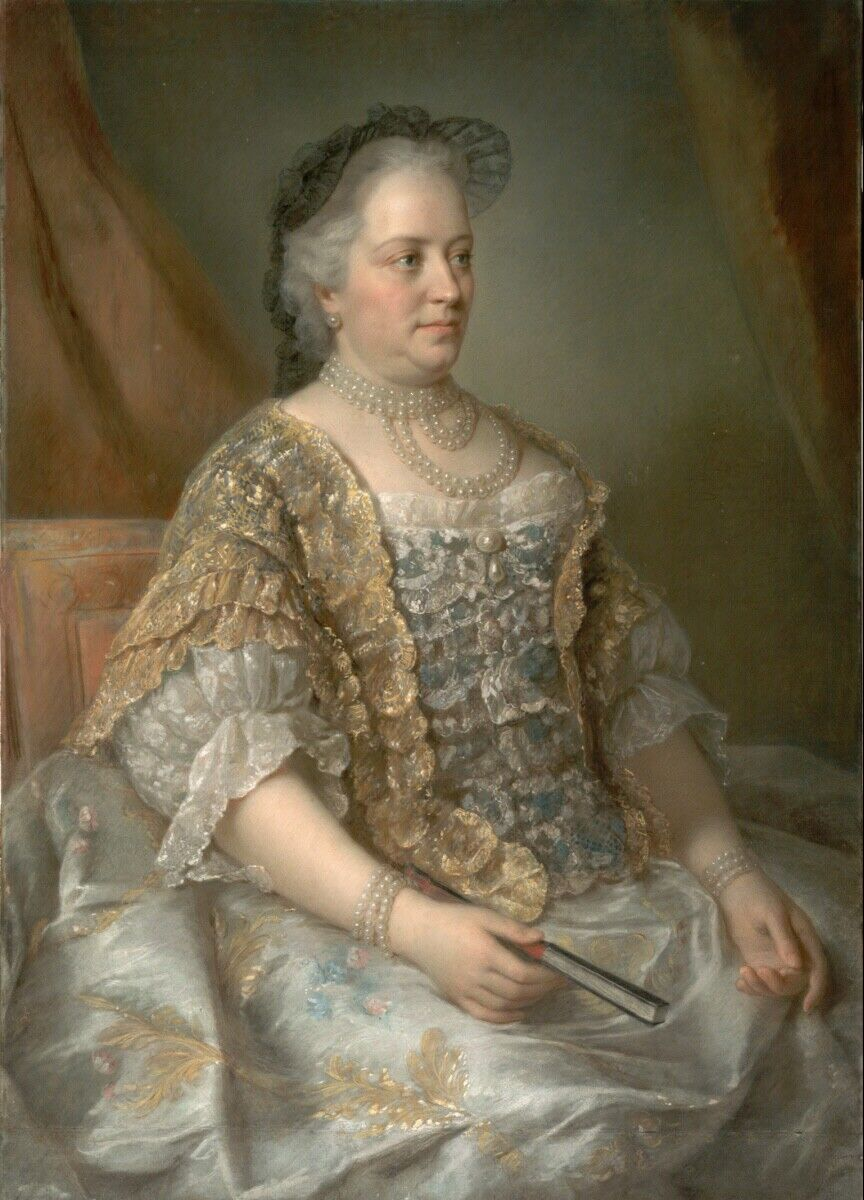
Maria Theresa of Austria. British support was crucial in allowing her to retain her throne during the War of the Austrian Succession. Still, she strongly distrusted the British.

In 1756, suspecting that Prussia was about to launch an invasion of Bohemia and fearing that the British would do nothing to help them because of a preoccupation with a dispute with France over the Ohio Country, Austria concluded an alliance with its traditional enemy, France. Britain, left out in the cold, made a hasty alliance with Prussia, hoping that the new balance of power would prevent war.

Unable to control its Prussian ally, Frederick the Great, who attacked Austria in 1756, Britain honoured its commitment to the Prussians and forged the Anglo-Prussian alliance. Although Britain and Austria did not declare war against each other, they were now aligned in opposing coalitions in the Seven Years' War. During the Capture of Emden in 1758, British and Austrian forces came close to open warfare. In spite of its efforts during the war, Austria was ultimately unable to retake Silesia, and the 1763 Treaty of Paris confirmed Prussian control of it.

== Aftermath ==
Britain had been growing increasingly less favourable to Austria, and the Austrophiles in Britain saw their influence decrease during and after the Seven Years' War. Austria was by now seen as increasingly autocratic and resistant to the spread of British liberal democracy.

In 1778, when France entered the American War of Independence to try to assist the American colonists to gain their independence, Britain sought to gain Austrian support for their efforts to put down the rebellion. Austria's entry into the war, it was believed, would have drawn off French troops that were sent to America. However, Austria refused to even seriously consider the proposal.

Britain and Austria later again became allies during the Napoleonic Wars, but they were both part of a broader anti-French coalition, and the relationship was nowhere near as close as it had been during the era of the Alliance. Once again, British subsidies became crucial to putting Austrian armies in the field, such as during the Flanders campaign of 1793–1794, when they received £1 million.

== See also ==
- Austria–United Kingdom relations
- Anglo-Sardinians Alliance
- Anglo-Prussian Alliance
- Great Britain in the Seven Years' War

== Bibliography ==
- Anderson, Fred. Crucible of War: The Seven Years' War and the Fate of Empire in British North America, 1754-1766. Faber and Faber, 2001
- Browning, Reed. The Duke of Newcastle. Yale University Press, 1975.
- McLynn, Frank. 1759: The Year Britain Became Master of the World. Pimlico, 2005.
- Murphy, Orvile T. Charles Gravier: Comete de Vergennes: French Diplomacy in the Age of Revolution. New York Press, 1982.
- Simms, Brendan. Three Victories and a Defeat: The Rise and Fall of the First British Empire. Penguin Books, 2008.
- Whiteley, Peter. Lord North: The Prime Minister who lost America. The Hambledon Press, 1996.
