= Austrophile =

Person with strong interest in or love of Austrian people, culture, and history

An Austrophile is somebody who is fond of Austrian culture and Austria in general but not born there. Historically it could be applied to the wider Austrian Empire, but since 1918, it has applied to the more limited boundaries of the modern nation-state of Austria. It was later sometimes taken as part of a wider Germanophile attitude and generally linked to the admiration of the Germanic culture of the German-speaking world or countries, mainly Germany, Austria, Switzerland and Liechtenstein.

== History ==
The term "austrophile" carried different meanings throughout history. The term was used to refer to 19th Century Austrian nationalist societies that were trying to resist the strong cultural influence that the German Empire carried in the Habsburg monarchy.

Additionally, the term was also used to describe citizens of the Austrian Empire who were not ethnically Austrian, but were strong supporters of the Austrian control over their native region. Similarly, during the War of the Spanish Succession, supporters of the House of Habsburg and its pretender to the throne, Archduke Charles, were known as Austrophiles.

In Britain, during the 18th century, there were a number of prominent Austrophiles, including Prime Minister Thomas Pelham-Holles, 1st Duke of Newcastle-upon-Tyne. Austrophiles sought an alliance with Austria against France. Opposed to the Francophiles, who saw French dominance in Europe as inevitable both culturally and militarily, they obtained the Anglo-Austrian Alliance. The movement led to British support for the Austrian Empress Maria Theresa during the Austrian War of Succession. They were opposed by the Austrophobes, who tried to draw attention to Austria's perceived autocracy and suppression of Protestant minorities.
