= European balance of power =

International relations doctrine

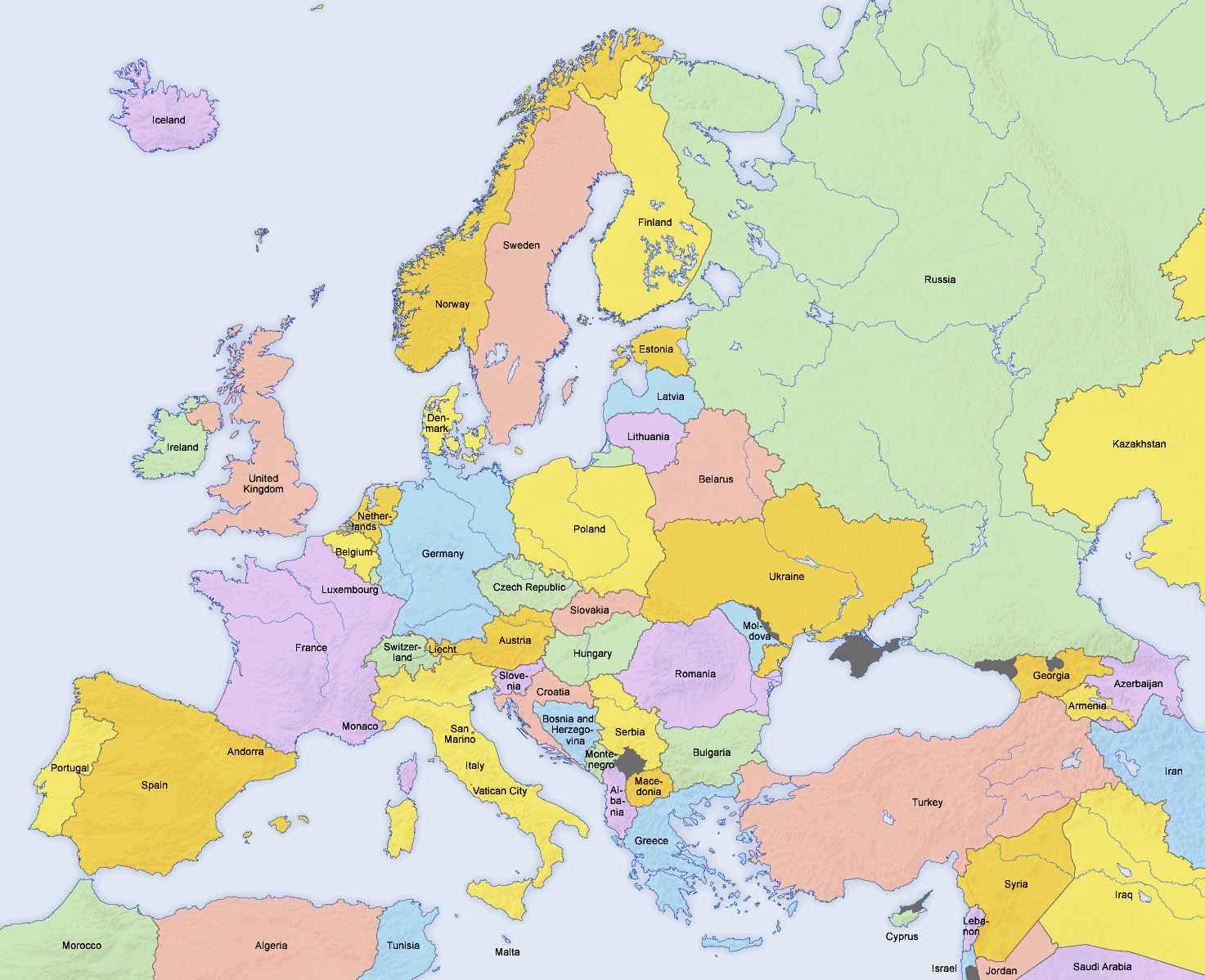
Political map of Europe and the surrounding region (2006)

The European balance of power is a tenet in international relations that no single power should be allowed to achieve hegemony over a substantial part of Europe. During much of the modern era, the balance was achieved by having a small number of ever-changing alliances contending for power, which culminated in the world wars of the early 20th century.

== History ==
=== Antiquity to Crusades ===
The emergence of city-states (poleis) in ancient Greece marks the beginning of classical antiquity. The two most important Greek cities, the Ionian-democratic Athens and the Dorian-aristocratic Sparta, led the successful defense of Greece against the invading Persians from the east, but then clashed against each other for supremacy in the Peloponnesian War. The Kingdom of Macedon took advantage of the following instability and established a single rule over Greece. Desire to form a universal monarchy brought Alexander the Great to annex the entire Persian Empire and begin a Hellenization of the Macedonian possessions. At his death in 323 BC, his reign was divided between his successors and several Hellenistic kingdoms were formed.

Rome expanded into the whole of Italy around the same period and then rose to prominence in the western and Eastern Mediterranean through the Punic Wars and Macedonian Wars, but was then shaken by a century-long political crisis. Meanwhile, the popularity and wealth of Roman generals increased: notably Julius Caesar acquired fame for projecting military power north of the Alps into Gaul, east of the Rhine into Germania and across the Channel into Britain. A group of senators afraid of Caesar's title of dictator for life assassinated him on the Ides of March of 44 BC. The adoptive son of Caesar, Octavian Augustus, defeated the killers of his father and became the first Roman Emperor (Princeps) in 27 BC.

The Roman Empire peaked during the Pax Romana, stagnated during the crisis of the third century AD and ultimately split between the Greek East and Latin West. Both parts of the Empire abandoned pagan polytheism in order to tolerate monotheistic Christianity and finally make it the state religion. The West collapsed around 476, following centuries of attacks by mainly Germanic peoples and several successor states were established on its former territory. The East continued to be ruled by the Byzantine Empire for an additional thousand years.

Among the successor states in the West, that of the Franks was the largest, and under Charlemagne managed to unite most of present-day France, Germany, Switzerland, Austria, the Low Countries and Italy under one rule: he was subsequently crowned Holy Roman Emperor the day of Christmas in 800 by Pope Leo III. This led to a conflict with the Byzantine Empire, the so-called problem of two emperors saw both empires being unable wage war with each other making other disputes and common threats the dominating factor of their relations.

Meanwhile, the Iberian Peninsula fell under Muslim control. The beginning of the Reconquista of Christian forces is traditionally dated to the Battle of Covadonga (718 or 722), in which an Asturian army achieved the first Christian victory over the forces of the Umayyad Caliphate since the beginning of the military invasion. Its culmination came in 1492 with the fall of the Nasrid kingdom of Granada to the united Spanish Crown of Ferdinand II of Aragon and Isabella I of Castile. The Germanic Emperor (Holy Roman Emperor) and the Roman Pontiff (Pope in Rome) came to be known as the universal powers of Europe, but then entered in conflict during the investiture controversy and the clash between their factions. Their rivalry made possible the birth of autonomous city-states in northern Italy and the rise of an independent feudal monarchy in France under the House of Capet. Around the same period, the Norman Conquest of England happened in 1066 and Sicily fell in 1130. With the Holy Land lost to Islam and the Romans seeking help from Turks, the Pope initiated the First Crusade against the Muslims in an attempt to restore Christian authority in former Roman lands following the Eastern Schism of the Orthodox from the Catholics.

Most of the crusades did not achieve their objective, but some of them had a massive impact on the political and economic landscape of Europe: the First Crusade (1099) re-opened the trade routes in the Mediterranean and ushered in the commercial revolution; the Fourth Crusade (1204) resulted in the formation of the Venetian maritime empire; and the Sixth Crusade (1228) temporarily made Frederick II, heir of both the Kingdom of Sicily the Holy Roman Empire, and King of Jerusalem. At the same time, the Reconquista was taking place in the Iberian Peninsula and the kingdoms of Portugal, Castile and Aragon were formed. A vast part of the French nobility took part in the crusades under the leadership of their king: this made possible the formation of a strong centralized French monarchy. The rise of medieval France began with the Battle of Bouvines (1214), the German Interregnum (1250) and the Avignon Papacy (1309) but ended with the outbreak of the Hundred Years' War (1337) with England and the return of the papacy to Rome (1378). After Europe recovered from the Black Death, the goldsmith Johannes Gutenberg invented the movable-type printing press, which started the Printing Revolution. A Renaissance in art and science began in Italy and spread to the rest of the continent.

=== Crusades to Westphalia ===
Portugal formed the first European colonial empire in 1415 with the conquest of Ceuta. In 1453, the French expelled the English from their land, and the Ottoman Turks conquered Constantinople, initiating the dominance of the Ottoman Empire in Europe. At the end of the 15th century, following the marriage of Isabella I of Castile and Ferdinand II of Aragon Spain was dynastically unified and the Reconquista concluded successfully. Portugal and Spain, followed by France and England, ushered in the Age of Discovery. During the early 16th century, France and the House of Habsburg clashed during the Italian Wars. In 1519, Charles V of Habsburg, already Duke of Burgundy, King of Spain, and Archduke of Austria, became Holy Roman Emperor. After the defeat in the Battle of Pavia, Francis I of France allied with the Muslim Ottoman sultan Suleiman the Magnificent. After the annexation of the Aztec Empire and conquest of the Incas, Emperor Charles used the gold and silver coming from the Americas to finance the defence of his German territories in Austria from the Ottoman Empire (Siege of Vienna) and of his Italian territories in the Duchy of Milan from France (Battle of Pavia). In response, European rival states sanctioned privateers to raid Spanish or Portuguese ships full of gold and silver, most especially in the Caribbean. Ultimately, Charles V conceded the Peace of Augsburg and abandoned his multi-national project with a series of abdications in 1556 that divided his hereditary and imperial domains between the Spanish Habsburgs, headed by his son Philip II of Spain, and the Austrian Habsburgs, headed by his brother Ferdinand. Ferdinand had been Archduke of Austria in Charles's name since 1521 and the designated successor as emperor since 1531.

The papacy launched the Catholic revival in an attempt to halt the growth of Protestantism and Ottoman expansion. Despite some successes, such as the Battle of Lepanto (1571) and the Siege of Paris (1590), the Anglo-Spanish War and the Long Turkish War questioned the Catholic ambitions. Ultimately, the papacy lost its status and influence with the Thirty Years' War (1618–1648) where the Catholic French empire allied with the Protestant nations to defeat the Habsburg alliance. The Thirty Years War was one of the longest and most destructive conflicts in European history. Fought primarily in Central Europe, an estimated 4.5 to 8 million soldiers and civilians died as a result of battle, famine, and disease, while some areas of what is now modern Germany experienced population declines of over 50%. Related conflicts include the Eighty Years' War, the War of the Mantuan Succession, the Franco-Spanish War, the Dutch-Portuguese War and the Portuguese Restoration War. Many Protestant states also experienced a golden age: the newly independent Netherlands formed the Dutch East India Company in Indonesia; Sweden formed an empire in northern Europe; and England began the colonization of North America. By the Treaty of Westphalia at the end of the Thirty Years' War, the Holy Roman Empire became a more decentralized entity in which constituent states, such as Prussia (which also had lands outside the Empire), were allowed to pursue their own foreign policy independent of that of the Austrian Habsburg Emperor. The Austrian Habsburgs also controlled some states outside of the Holy Roman Empire. It was France under Louis XIV who took the status of main continental power from the Habsburgs thanks to the Treaty of Westphalia and the Treaty of the Pyrenees.

=== Stately quadrille ===
Within the Holy Roman Empire, specifically smaller states were interested in keeping the balance. After the Peace of Westphalia, Sweden and France became "Guarantors of the imperial constitution" who could be called by the Estates or Emperor to keep the status quo. Russia (at least in their view) joined in 1779 with the Treaty of Teschen which ended the War of the Bavarian Succession. Following the war, Austria offered the Duke of Bavaria a trade to become King of Burgundy in 1785, the Fürstenbund was formed seeing this proposal as a disturbing the balance.

In the 16th and 17th centuries, English and Dutch foreign policy strove to prevent a creation of a single universal monarchy in Europe, which many believed France or Spain might attempt to create. To maintain the balance of power, the English and Dutch made alliances with other states—including Portugal and the Holy Roman Empire—to counter the perceived threat. These Grand Alliances reached their height in the wars against Louis XIV and Louis XV of France. They often involved the English (later the British) and Dutch paying large subsidies to European allies to finance large armies.

In the 18th century, this led to the stately quadrille, with the major European powers of that century—Austria, Prussia, Great Britain, and France—changing alliances multiple times to prevent the hegemony of one nation or alliance. A number of wars stemmed, at least in part, from the desire to maintain the balance of power, including the War of the Spanish Succession, War of the Austrian Succession, the Seven Years' War, the War of the Bavarian Succession and the Napoleonic Wars. Following Britain's success in the Seven Years' War during which it was allied with Prussia, many of the other powers began to see Great Britain as a greater threat than France. Several states, most particularly France, entered the American War of Independence in the hope of overturning Britain's growing strength by securing the independence of the Thirteen colonies of British America.

To keep the balance, Prussia demanded after the Russo-Turkish War of 1768–1774 and the Austro-Russo-Turkish War compensation, leading to the Partitions of Poland.

=== 19th century ===
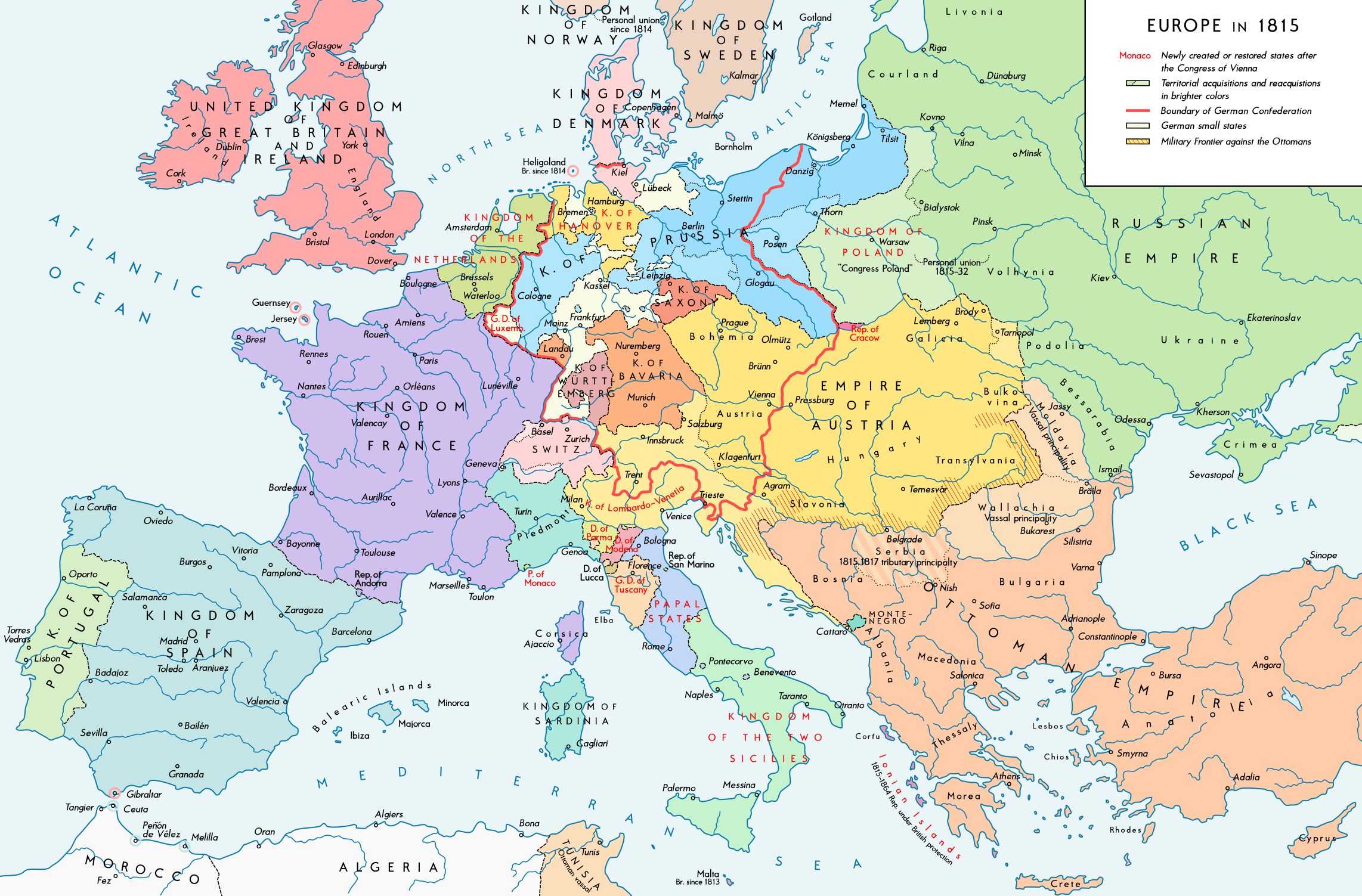
The national boundaries within Europe set by the Congress of Vienna

After the end of the Napoleonic Wars, during which France directly or indirectly controlled much of Europe except for Russia, and the Holy Roman Empire was dissolved, the Concert of Europe tried to maintain the balance of power. The territorial boundaries agreed to by the victorious Great Powers (Prussia, Austria, Russia and Great Britain) at the Congress of Vienna in 1815 were maintained, and even more important there was an acceptance of the theme of balance with no major aggression. Otherwise the Congress system says historian Roy Bridge, "failed" by 1823. In 1818, the British decided not to become involved in continental issues that did not directly affect them. They rejected the plan of Tsar Alexander I to suppress future revolutions. The Concert system fell apart as the common goals of the Great Powers were replaced by growing political and economic rivalries. Artz says the Congress of Verona in 1822 "marked the end." There was no Congress called to restore the old system during the great revolutionary upheavals of 1848 with their demands for revision of the Congress of Vienna's frontiers along national lines.

Britain, with its naval, maritime, commercial and financial dominance, was committed to the European balance of power after 1815. Between the 1830s and 1850, Britain and France were the strongest powers in Europe, but by the 1850s they had become deeply concerned by the growing power of Russia, which had expanded westward towards Central Europe, and Prussia, which was increasingly assuming greater control and influence over the German lands, aside from Austria. The Crimean War of 1854–55 and the Italian War of 1859 shattered the relations among the Great Powers in Europe.

The creation in 1871 and rise of the Prussian-led German Empire (excluding Austria) as a dominant nation (Prussia had quickly defeated both Austria and France in wars) restructured the European balance of power. For the next twenty years, Otto von Bismarck managed to maintain the balance of power, by proposing treaties and creating many complex alliances between the European nations such as the Triple Alliance.

=== World Wars ===
Formal and informal military and diplomatic connections in 1914 Triple Entente Triple Alliance

After 1890, the German Emperor Kaiser Wilhelm II set out on his imperialist course of Weltpolitik ("world politics") to increase the empire's influence in and control over the world. Newly created alliances were proven to be fragile, something that triggered the First World War in 1914 with Germany and Austria-Hungary on one-side against Great Britain, France, Italy (from 1915) and Russia (until 1917) on the other. One of the objectives of the Treaty of Versailles, the main post-World War I treaty, was to abolish the dominance of the 'Balance of Power' concept and replace it with the (global) League of Nations and to form countries based mostly on ethnicity (although the diminished Austria containing only its German-speaking lands and the majority-German areas of the Czech lands were not permitted to join Germany).

By the late 1930s, the European balance of power involved shifting relations among the liberal democracies of Britain and France, Nazi Germany and Fascist Italy, and the communist Soviet Union. Germany and the Soviet Union concluded the German–Soviet non-aggression pact in August 1939. Germany's invasion of Poland the following month prompted Britain and France to declare war on Germany, beginning the Second World War in Europe. Following Germany's invasion of the Soviet Union on 22 June 1941, Britain and the Soviet Union became allies despite longstanding hostility between their governments. Together with the United States, they formed a coalition against German domination of Europe.

=== Post-World War II: Cold War period ===
During the post-Second World War era, the Allies split into two blocs, a balance of power emerged among the Eastern Bloc (affiliated with the Soviet Union and the Socialist nations of Central and Eastern Europe, Central Asia, and the Caucasus), the Western Bloc (affiliated with the Western democracies, particularly France, the United States, and the United Kingdom), and neutral or non-aligned countries (including Ireland, Sweden, Switzerland, Austria, and Yugoslavia), with German lands divided up between them respectively as East Germany and West Germany until 1989. Most Western Bloc countries came together under the military alliance of NATO, while the Eastern Bloc countries formed the Warsaw Pact. The first NATO Secretary General, the British Lord Ismay, famously stated the organization's initial goal was "to keep the Russians out, the Americans in, and the Germans down."

=== Post-Cold War era ===
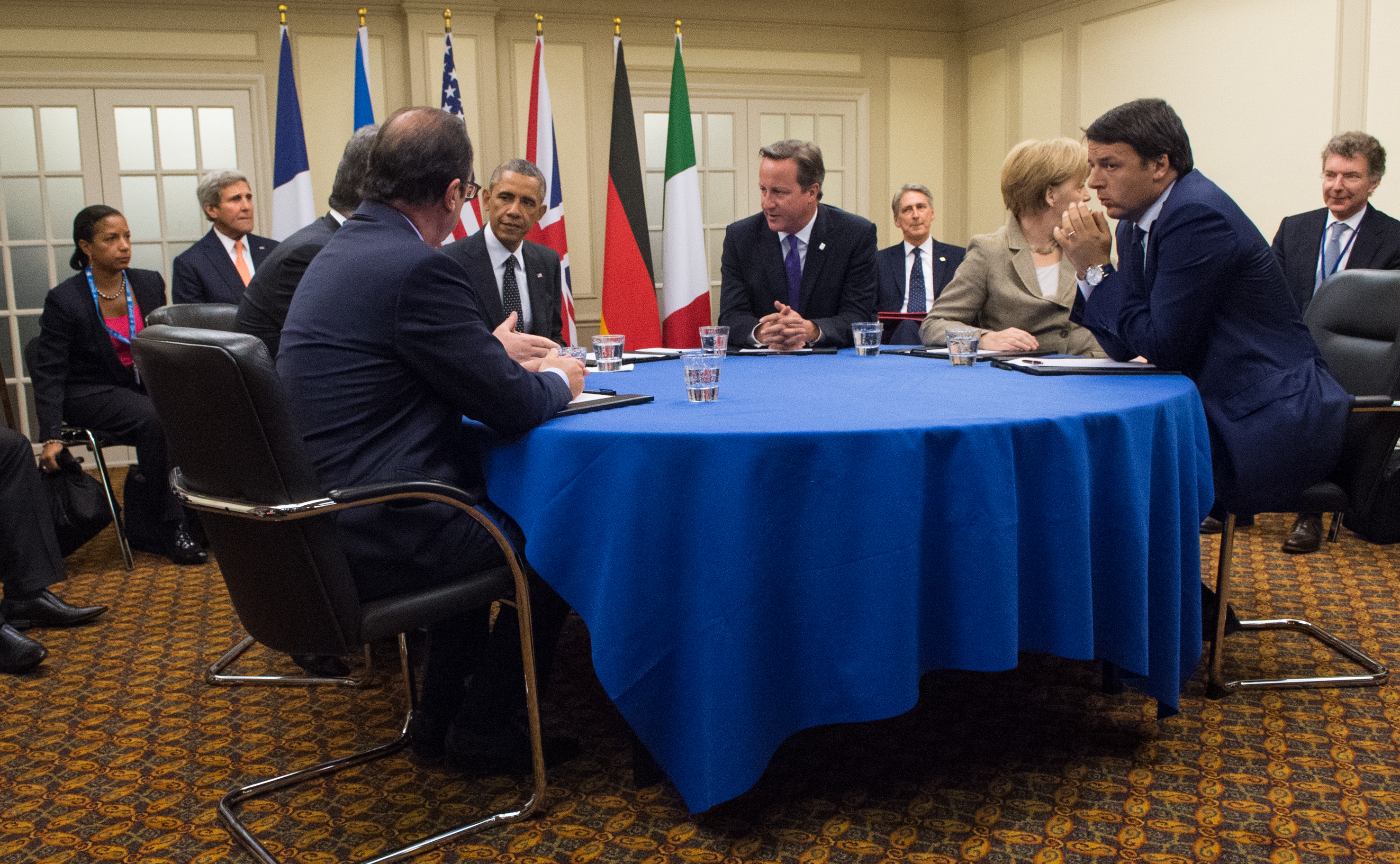
NATO Quint leaders discussing with Petro Poroshenko the Russo-Ukrainian War

The three most powerful members of the European Union — France, Italy and Germany — as well as the United Kingdom are referred to as the Big Four of Western Europe. They are major European powers and the only EU countries individually represented as full members of the G7, the G8, and the G20. The NATO Quint is made up by the United States and the Big Four.

The term G4 is especially (although not only) used to describe meeting of the four nations at the leaders' level. In addition, the term EU three (or G-3) was used to describe the grouping of foreign ministers from France, the United Kingdom, (at the time is still a European Union member state) and Germany (now re-unified) during the Iran nuclear talks. On the other hand, the grouping of interior ministers that includes Spain and Poland is known as the G6. Germany (which has the largest economy in Europe) is often regarded as the EU's economic leader, such as with the European sovereign debt crisis, whilst France and the United Kingdom (both permanent members of the UNSC) often lead in defence and foreign policy matters, such as the intervention in Libya in 2011. This, to an extent, represents a balancing of leadership power for the Western sphere of the continent. How this balance will change after Brexit in 2020 is still an open matter.

However, there continues to be a wider, strategic balance of Western and (now) Russian power, albeit with the boundary between the two pushed further east since the collapse of the Soviet Union, with many former Communist countries in Central Europe having since joined the EU and NATO.

== See also ==
- Balance of power (international relations)
- Concert of Europe
- Great power
- International relations (1814–1919)
- List of modern great powers
- Precedence among European monarchies
- Treaty of Versailles

== Bibliography ==
- Albrecht-Carrié, René. A Diplomatic History of Europe Since the Congress of Vienna (1958), 736pp; basic survey.
- Bartlett, C. J. Peace, War and the European Powers, 1814–1914 (1996) brief overview 216pp.
- Clark, Christopher. Iron Kingdom: The Rise and Downfall of Prussia 1600–1947. Penguin Books, 2007.
- Collins, Roger (1989). The Arab Conquest of Spain, 710–797. Oxford: Blackwell Publishing. ISBN 0-631-15923-1.
- Deyermond, Alan (1985). "The Death and Rebirth of Visigothic Spain in the Estoria de España". Revista Canadiense de Estudios Hispánicos. 9 (3): 345–67.
- Hillgarth, J. N. (2009). The Visigoths in History and Legend. Toronto: Pontifical Institute for Medieval Studies.
- Kennedy, Paul. The Rise and Fall of the Great Powers Economic Change and Military Conflict From 1500–2000 (1987), stress on economic and military factors.
- Kissinger, Henry. Diplomacy (1995), 940pp; not a memoir but an interpretive history of international diplomacy since the late 18th century.
- Langer, William. An Encyclopedia of World History (5th ed. 1973); highly detailed outline of events.
- Parker, Geoffrey (1984). The Thirty Years' War (1997 ed.). Routledge. ISBN 978-0-415-12883-4.
- Reilly, Bernard F. (1993). The Medieval Spains. Cambridge Medieval Textbooks. Cambridge, UK: Cambridge University Press. ISBN 0-521-39741-3.
- Reynolds, David (1994). The Origins of the Cold War in Europe: International Perspectives. Yale University Press. ISBN 978-0-300-10562-9.
- Simms, Brendan. Three Victories and a Defeat. Penguin Books, 2008.
- Strachan, Hew. The First World War. Simon & Schuster, 2006.
