= Diplomatic Revolution of 1756 =

Reversal of major European alliances in 1756

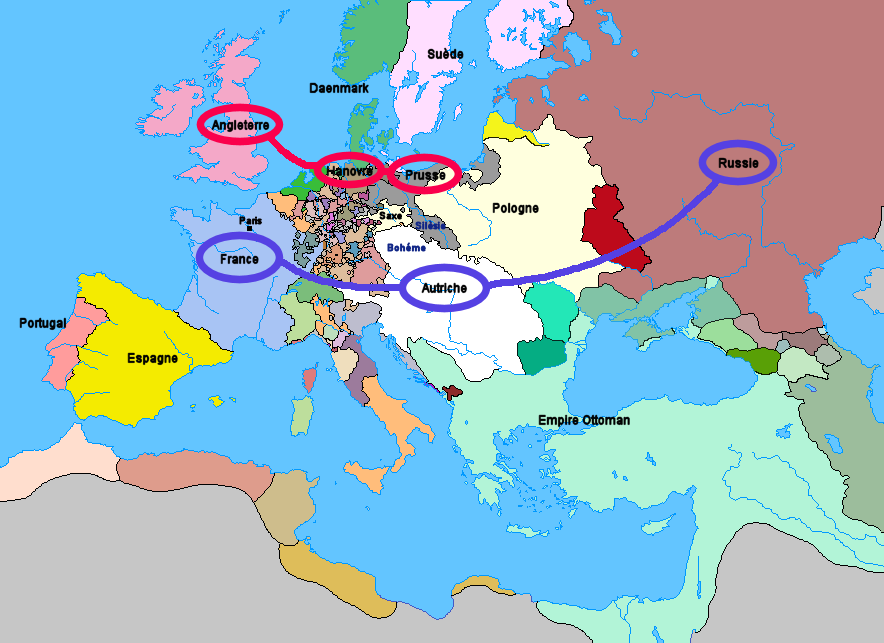
The alliances formed as a result of the Diplomatic Revolution

The Diplomatic Revolution of 1756 was the reversal of longstanding alliances in Europe between the War of the Austrian Succession and the Seven Years' War. Austria went from an ally of Britain to an ally of France; the Dutch Republic, a long-standing British ally, became more anti-British and took a neutral stance while Prussia became an ally of Britain. The most influential diplomat involved was an Austrian statesman, Wenzel Anton von Kaunitz. The change was part of the stately quadrille, a constantly shifting pattern of alliances throughout the 18th century to preserve or upset the European balance of power.

== Background ==
The diplomatic change was triggered by a separation of interests among Austria, Britain, and France. The Peace of Aix-la-Chapelle, after the War of the Austrian Succession in 1748, left Austria aware of the high price it paid for the Anglo-Austrian Alliance. Maria Theresa had defended her claim to the Habsburg lands and had her husband, Francis Stephen, crowned emperor in 1745. She had been forced to relinquish valuable territory in the process. Under British diplomatic pressure, Maria Theresa had given up part of the Duchy of Milan and occupied Bavaria. The British also forced her to cede the Duchy of Parma and Piacenza to Spain and, more importantly, to abandon the valuable province of Silesia (the Silesian duchies) to Prussian occupation.

Another major cause for the failure of the old system was the situation in the Austrian Netherlands. During the War of the Austrian Succession, the Dutch barrier fortresses in the Austrian Netherlands, which bound the Dutch and British to defend those lands, had been captured by French armies. Paris had subsequently ordered the dismantling of the defenses of the captured barrier towns. When the French armies returned home in 1748, the Austrian Netherlands had been turned into an open plain. This act marked the end of the Dutch Republic as a major power and made Austria realize that the British and the Dutch were no longer able to defend the Austrian Netherlands. Only rapprochement with France could secure these territories.

During the war, Frederick II of Prussia had seized Silesia, one of the Lands of the Bohemian Crown. That acquisition had further advanced Prussia as a great European power, which now posed an increasing threat to Austria's German lands and to Central Europe. The growth of Prussia, dangerous to Austria, was welcomed by the British, who saw it as a means of balancing French power and reducing French influence in Germany, which might otherwise have grown in response to Austrian weakness.

== Westminster Convention ==
The results of the War of the Austrian Succession made it clear that Britain no longer viewed Austria as powerful enough to check France, but was content to build up smaller states like Prussia. Britain and Prussia, in the Westminster Convention (16 January 1756), agreed that Britain would not aid Austria in a renewed conflict for Silesia if Prussia agreed to protect Hanover from France. Protection of Hanover was important to Britain because it was a possession of its king, George II (who had been born and raised in the Electorate). Britain felt that with Prussia's growing strength, it would be more able to defend Hanover than Austria.

Austria was determined to reclaim Silesia and so the two allies found themselves with conflicting interests. Maria Theresa recognized the futility of renewed alliance with Britain and so set out to align Austria with France, which could replace Britain as an ally. Maria Theresa knew that without a powerful ally such as France, she could never hope to reclaim Silesia from Frederick. The agreement was followed by a more direct Anglo-Prussian Convention in 1758.

== First Treaty of Versailles ==
Maria Theresa sent her foreign policy minister, Count Wenzel Anton von Kaunitz, to France to secure an alliance to enable Austria to reclaim Silesia. Kaunitz approached Madame de Pompadour, Louis XV's mistress, to intervene in the negotiations. Louis XV proved reluctant to agree to any treaty presented by Kaunitz. It took renewed conflict between France and Britain for Louis to align with Austria. Habsburg possessions no longer surrounded France; instead, Frederick II had managed to end the prospect of Habsburg-German dominion bordering French lands. France no longer saw Austria as an immediate threat and so entered into a defensive alliance with Austria. In response to the Westminster Convention, Louis XV's ministers and Kaunitz concluded the First Treaty of Versailles (1 May 1756) in which both sides agreed to remain neutral and to provide 24,000 troops if either got into conflict with a third party.

== Second Treaty of Versailles ==
Maria Theresa's diplomats, after securing French neutrality, began to establish an anti-Prussian coalition. Austria's actions alerted Frederick II, who decided to strike first by invading Saxony, commencing the Seven Years' War (1756–1763). Frederick's actions were meant to scare Russia out of supporting Austria, both of which had formed a defensive alliance in 1746. By invading Saxony, Frederick had inflamed his enemies; Russia, under the direction of Empress Elizabeth, sent an additional 80,000 troops to Austria. One year after the signing of the First Treaty of Versailles, France and Austria signed a new offensive alliance, the Second Treaty of Versailles, on 1 May 1757. Austria promised France the Austrian Netherlands, but in return, Maria Theresa would receive Parma, 129,000 French troops and the promise of 12 million livres every year until Silesia was returned to Austria.

== Aftermath ==
Britain and Prussia faced Austria, France and Russia. The Dutch Republic, which was no longer directly threatened by France because of the Franco-Austrian alliance, refused to fight for Britain's interests and stayed neutral. Despite the reversal of alliances, the basic antagonisms remained, Prussia versus Austria and Britain versus France. The Seven Years' War ended in a victory for Britain and Prussia, aided by the Miracle of the House of Brandenburg and Britain's control of the seas, which was enhanced by success during its 1759 annus mirabilis. France, Austria, and their European allies ultimately were unsuccessful in their aims. The Anglo-Prussian Alliance proved to be short-lived largely because Britain withdrew financial and military support for Prussia in 1762; Prussia allied with Russia instead. The dissolution of the alliance and the new pre-eminence of Britain left it with no allies when the American Revolutionary War broke out.

== See also ==
- Great Britain in the Seven Years' War
- Anglo-Austro-Sardinian Alliance of 1743
- Balance of power (international relations)
