= Treaty of Vienna (1725) =

1725 series of treaties

Peace of Vienna
Articles of Peace between his Imperial and Catholic Majesty Charles VI. and his Royal Catholic Majesty Philip V. Concluded at Vienna, the 30th of April, 1725.
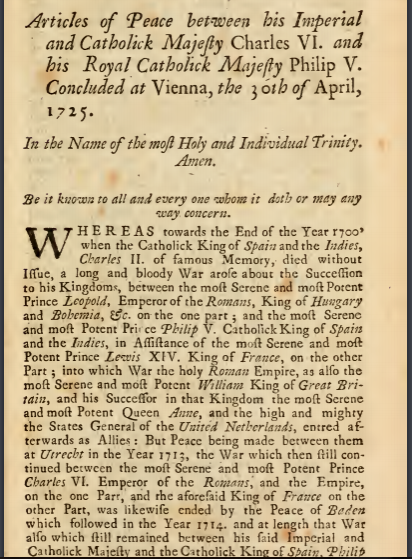
- Type: Peace, Defensive Alliance, Commerce
- Context: Stately Quadrille
- Signed: 5 November 1725
- Location: Vienna, Austria
- Effective: 26 January 1726
- Expiry: 16 March 1731 (alliance only)
- Negotiators: List: (Holy Roman Empire) Count Philipp von Sinzendorf; (Austrian Empire) Count Gundaker von Starhemberg; (Spain) John William, 1st Duke of Ripperda
- Signatories: List: (Holy Roman Empire) Prince Eugene of Savoy; (Holy Roman Empire) Count Philipp von Sinzendorf; (Holy Roman Empire) Vice-Chancellor Friedrich von Schönborn; (Austrian Empire) Count Gundaker von Starhemberg; (Austrian Empire) Count Ernest von Windisch-Graetz; (Spain) John William, 1st Duke of Ripperda
- Ratifiers: Holy Roman Empire; (Austrian Empire) Habsburg monarchy; Bourbon Spain
- Languages: Latin, Spanish, French

The Peace of Vienna, also known as the First Treaty of Vienna, was a series of four treaties signed between 30 April 1725 and 5 November 1725 involving the Habsburg Monarchy, the Holy Roman Empire (on behalf of Austria), and Bourbon Spain. A new military alliance was formed, with the Russian Empire joining later in 1726. This Viennese alliance caused Austria to withdraw from the Quadruple Alliance, resulting in a diplomatic shift which led other great powers to coalesce into the Hanoverian Alliance months later in September. The rival alliances did not clash militarily, although tensions led to the limited Fourth Anglo-Spanish War in 1727.

In their new partnership, the Habsburgs gave up all formal claims to the Spanish throne, while Spain renounced its claims to the southern Netherlands and several other territories. Trade treaties were established between the two countries. The most significant article entailed Spanish recognition of the Ostend East India Company and the granting of free docking rights, including the ability to refuel in Spanish colonies. Additionally, a publicly signed treaty confirmed a defensive alliance. Later in the year, both parties signed a secret treaty, solidifying a general alliance between the two nations.

== Peace Provisions ==
=== Friendship between Spain and the Empire ===
Following the War of the Quadruple Alliance and the preceding War of the Spanish Succession, Austria and Spain found it necessary to establish a bilateral peace agreement to address mutual concerns. This treaty was inspired by the Treaty of London in 1718 and the Treaty of The Hague in 1720.

=== Claim to the Kingdoms of Sardinia ===
Before the War of the Spanish Succession, the Kingdom of Sardinia had consistently been under the personal union of the King of Spain, and previously of Aragon). However, during the War of the Spanish Succession, the Austrians occupied Sardinia and the crown passed into the hands of Charles VI. In 1720, the kingdom was granted to Duke Victor Amadeus II of the House of Savoy, effectively merging with the Savoy lands to establish the Kingdom of Sardinia-Piedmont. Charles VI formally renounced his claim to the kingdom.

=== Recognition of the Peace of Utrecht ===
The Peace of Utrecht contained an important provision that prevented the newly established Spanish Bourbons from claiming the French throne, and the French Bourbons from claiming the Spanish throne. This provision aimed to prevent a possible personal union between France and Spain. Its importance was further emphasized by its reaffirmation in Vienna.

=== Habsburg renunciation of the Kingdom of Spain ===
Emperor Charles VI renounced all familial claims to the Kingdom of Spain, which allowed King Philip V to become the undisputed heir to the Spanish throne. Charles's decision mirrored that of Philippe, Duke of Orléans, who also renounced his claim to the Spanish throne during the Peace of Utrecht a decade earlier.

"By virtue of the said Renunciation, which his Imperial Majesty made for the sake of the general Safety of Europe, and in consideration that the Duke of Orleans had renounced, for himself and his Descendants, his Rights and Pretensions to the Kingdom of Spain, on Condition that neither the Emperor, nor any of his Descendants should ever succeed to the said Kingdoms; his Imperial and Catholic Majesty acknowledges King Philip V. for lawful King of Spain and the Indies; and will likewise let the said King of Spain', his Descendants, Heirs and Successors, Male and Female, peaceably enjoy all those Dominions of the Spanish Monarchy in Europe, in the Indies, and elsewhere, the Possession whereof was secured to him by the Treatys of Utrecht..."

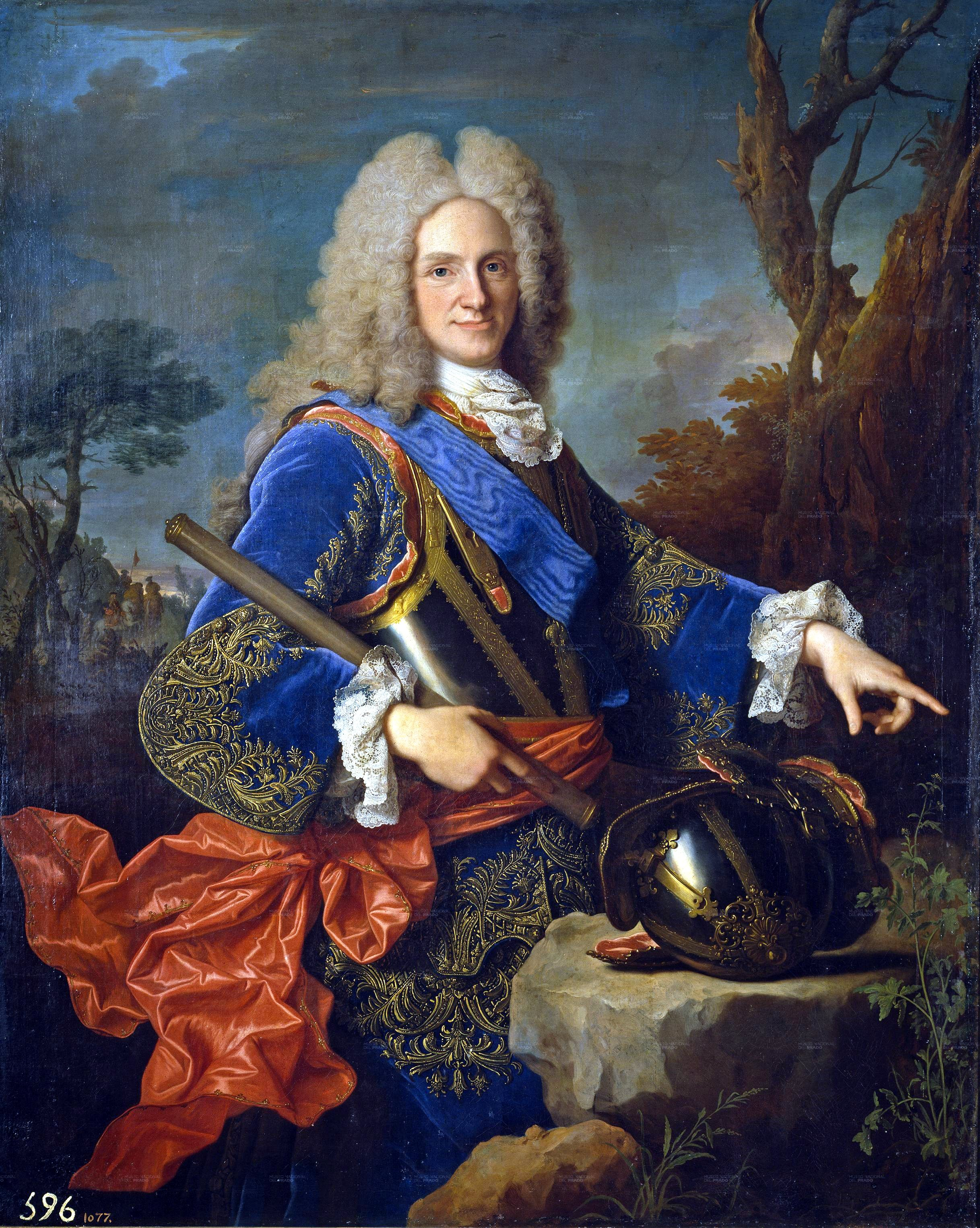
King Philip V, the first Bourbon king of Spain, appointed heir of the childless King Charles II.

=== Spanish renunciation of the Kingdom of Sicily ===
The Kingdom of Sicily, like Sardinia, was previously under Spanish rule. During the War of the Spanish Succession, it was occupied by Austria and later ceded to the Duke of Savoy in the Treaty of Utrecht. However, in 1717, during the War of the Quadruple Alliance, Austrian forces once again took control of Sicily. Victor Amadeus II, an ally of the empire, was initially ousted by the Spanish but later regained control.

The validity of the Austrian annexation of Sicily as a direct possession of Charles VI was subject to debate due to questions regarding its legitimacy. Despite Austrian claims, Philip V relinquished both his personal and hereditary rights to the Kingdom of Sicily.

==== Aftermath ====
Ten years later, Sicily returned to Bourbon control, this time under Charles I de Bourbon, Duke of Parma. He seized Sicily from the Austrians in the midst of the War of the Polish Succession and assumed the title of Charles V, King of Sicily in 1735. In 1759, following the death of his father Philip V, Charles ascended to the Spanish throne as Charles III. However, he was forced to cede his Italian territories to his son Ferdinand I.

=== Spanish renunciation of the Southern Netherlands ===
Prior to 1714, the Spanish ruled over a portion of the Low Countries, which was known as the Spanish Netherlands. This territory had been under Spanish dominion since the abdication of Charles V (Charles I of Spain) as Holy Roman Emperor in 1556. Before Spanish control, the provinces were conquered by the Austrians during the War of the Burgundian Succession.

After the War of the Spanish Succession, the Austrians regained control of the territory. The Peace of Utrecht decreed that the Spanish Netherlands should be returned to Austrian possession.

=== Succession in the Grand Duchy of Tuscany ===
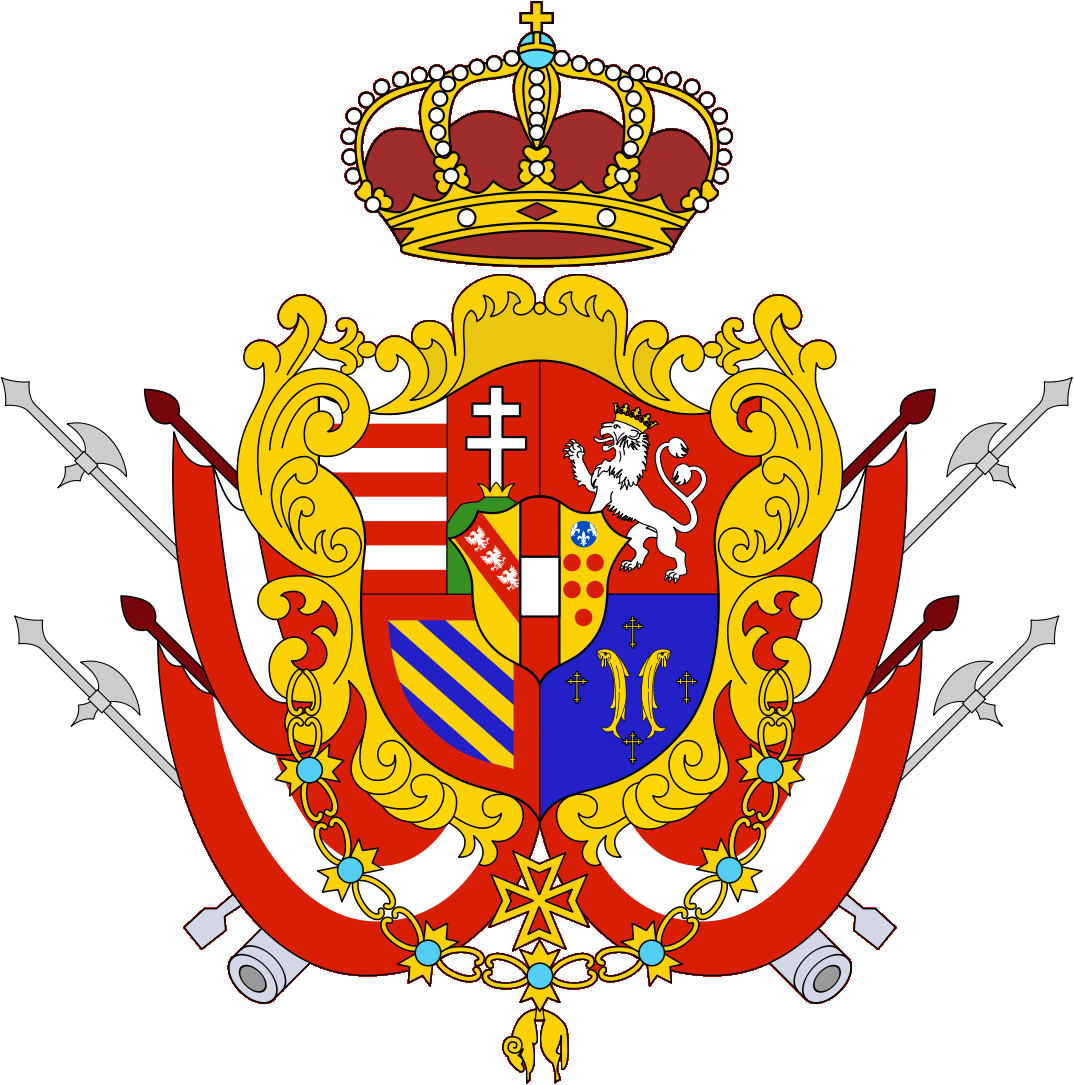
Coat of arms of the Grand Duchy of Tuscany

The Grand Duchy of Tuscany was the final territory in dispute. Charles VI and Philip V agreed that Elizabeth Farnese would confer the legal rights to Tuscany upon Charles VI's heir. Grand Duke Gian de' Medici, who was bedridden and childless, was unable to assert these rights. In addition, the Spanish Bourbons were granted rights to the Duchies of Parma and Piacenza. However, these duchies would remain fiefs of the Holy Roman Empire and not independent from imperial affairs.

=== Spanish concessions in Livorno and Elba ===
King Philip V agreed to establish Livorno as a free port accessible to both parties. The Sicilian segment of the island of Elba, including the township of Porto Logone, was to be ceded to the future heir to the Tuscan throne upon their ascension.

=== Spanish recognition of the Pragmatic Sanction ===
Charles VI achieved a significant victory when Philip V accepted his Pragmatic Sanction of 1713. Charles agreed to renounce his claim to the Spanish throne and committed to safeguarding the Spanish succession, while Philip endorsed the Austrian succession. The Spanish acknowledgment of the Sanction strengthened Charles's efforts to secure the Austrian succession for his daughter, Maria Theresa.

== Commerce Provision ==
=== Ostend East India Company ===
The most important commercial clause in the treaty was the recognition of the Ostend East India Company. Philip V granted the Company permission to dock and resupply in Spanish territories worldwide, provided that the vessels presented the necessary documentation. The Ostend Company received trading privileges equal to those of the United Provinces.

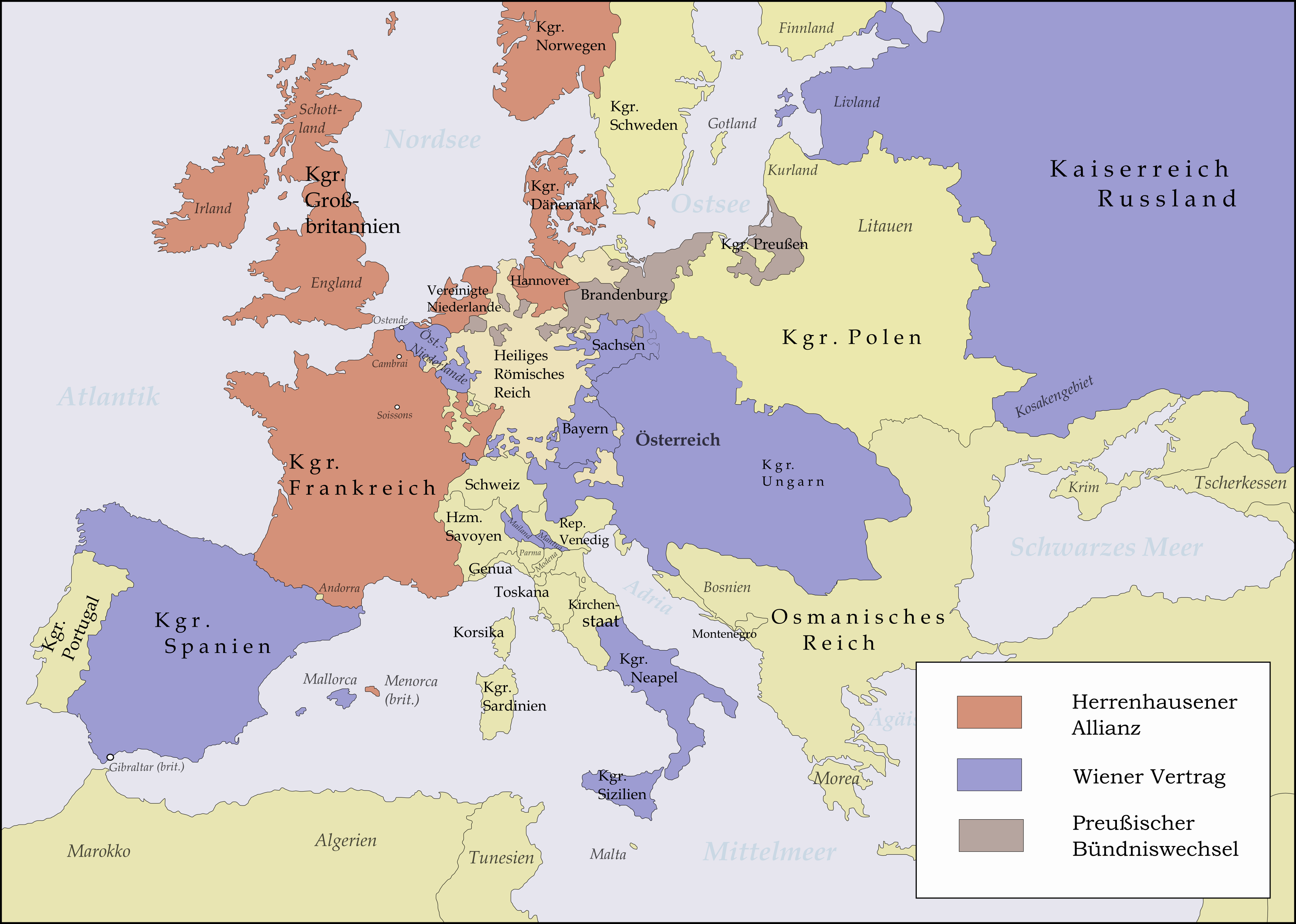
Alliance system of Europe during the first part of the Stately Quadrille. The signatories of the Treaty of Vienna are in blue, the Treaty of Hanover in red, and the Treaty of Berlin in grey.

== Defensive Provisions ==
=== Austro-Spanish alliance ===
The last of the three treaties created in Vienna was the defensive military alliance between the Habsburgs and Spain. After Spain's defeat in the War of the Quadruple Alliance and its weakening during the War of the Spanish Succession, the balance of power in Europe needed to be restored. The Habsburgs hoped that promoting peace and establishing a new relationship with Spain would help to reconfigure control. In case of aggression by a foreign power, both the army and navy would provide support.

=== Restitution of Gibraltar and Port Mahon ===
During the War of the Spanish Succession, Britain annexed Gibraltar and Port Mahon. Spain later attempted to regain control of these territories. Austria, choosing financial support over military intervention, acted as a mediator between Spain and Britain in case of war.

== See also ==
- War of the Spanish Succession
- War of the Quadruple Alliance
- War of the Polish Succession
- War of the Burgundian Succession
- Ostend East India Company
- Kingdom of Sardinia (1700-1720)
- Pragmatic Sanction of 1713
- Treaty of Vienna (1731)
- Treaty of Hanover (1725)
