= Anna Barbara Gignoux =

German businessperson

Anna Barbara Gignoux (1725–1796), was a German business person. She managed a substantial textile factory in Augsburg from 1761 onward, and was a major figure in the regional industrial development. She is mentioned in contemporary memoirs and was a patron of artists.
