= Stately quadrille =

18th-century European great power alliances

The stately quadrille is the name given to set of constantly shifting alliances between the great powers of Europe during the 18th century. The ultimate objective was to maintain the balance of power in Europe to stop any one alliance or country becoming too strong. It takes its name from the quadrille, a dance in which the participants constantly swap partners.

The most widely cited instance was in 1756, when Britain and Austria abandoned their 25-year-long Anglo-Austrian Alliance and instead made new alliances with their former enemies, Prussia and France, respectively. That was known as the Diplomatic Revolution.

== Background ==
Shifting alliances had long been a factor in European politics and were often regarded as responses to shifting power and threat. During the 16th century and the early 17th century, much of the emphasis in European politics had been on restricting the power of the Habsburgs in Spain and the Holy Roman Empire.

Under the reign of Louis XIV, France replaced the Habsburgs as the dominant power in Europe. France's rising power was challenged by the Europe-wide League of Augsburg in the Nine Years' War (1688–97). After a Bourbon monarch ascended to the Spanish throne, the League of Augsburg fought the French and Spanish in the War of the Spanish Succession, from 1702 to 1713, in an effort to restore the Habsburgs in Spain. The conflict resulted in Philip V remaining on the throne, although Spain lost its European empire.

== Quadrille ==
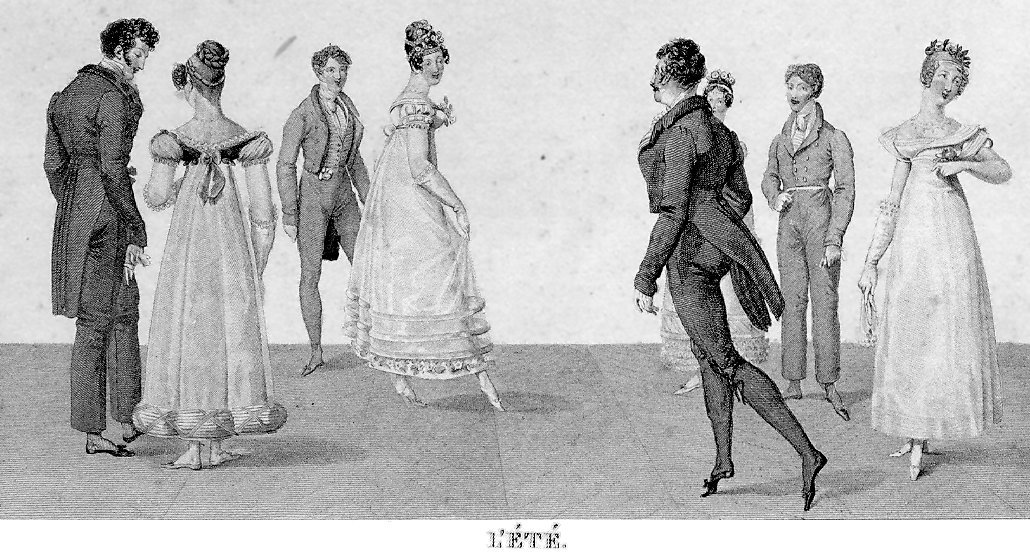
The quadrille was a popular dance of the 18th century. Because of its similarity to the way in which Great Powers swapped partners, the term was swiftly applied to describe it.

In the years immediately after the war, Britain and France, which were widely considered to have been the leaders of opposing coalitions in the last war, formed an Anglo-French Alliance and recognized that they shared temporary, mutual interests. In the years that followed, they managed to defeat a resurgent Spain, formerly a French ally, in the War of the Quadruple Alliance. Spain sought an alliance with Austria and gained it in 1725. Prussia abandoned their anti-Austrian policy in 1728.

By 1731, Britain and France were drifting apart. A diplomatic initiative with Austria was begun by the British government, and a new Anglo-Austrian Alliance was created. Spain withdrew its friendship with Austria and eventually ended up allied to France again. In 1732, Austria, Prussia and Russia formed an alliance.

In 1733, however the Anglo-Austrian Alliance seemed under threat, when the British failed to assist the Austrians in the War of the Polish Succession. Austria had to rely heavily on Russia for assistance and was forced to make huge concessions to Spain in the 1738 peace treaty. Britain realised that its failure to intervene had allowed France to become too strong.

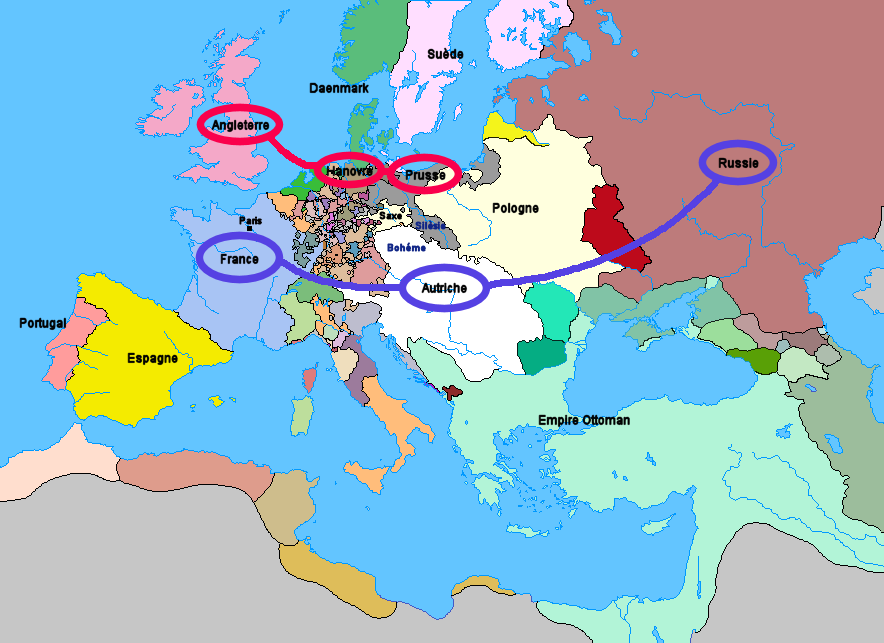
The stately quadrille reached its height in 1756, when several new alliances formed as a result of the Diplomatic Revolution.

In 1740, Prussia, an emerging power, attacked Austria. Britain and France soon became embroiled in the War of the Austrian Succession, which ended in a stalemate in 1748, but Austria appeared to have lost most in the war. Despite extensive British funding, it was increasingly disillusioned about the Anglo-Austrian Alliance and began looking for a replacement.

In 1756, Austria did what was considered unthinkable by many by abandoning its British connection to form a new alliance with France. Fearing that Continental Europe would be destabilized and led to war, Britain made an alliance with Prussia at the Convention of Westminster in the hope that a new balance of power would prevent war. Nevertheless, the Seven Years' War (1756–1763) broke out.

In 1764, the Russo-Prussian alliance was formed. Austria then formed a (never ratified) secret alliance with their old archrival the Ottoman Empire in 1771. Austria and Russia then formed an alliance against the Ottomans in 1781. Prussia in turn formed an alliance with the Sublime Porte in 1790 and the Prussian-British-Dutch alliance mediated the Treaty of Sistova which ended the Austro-Turkish War(s). These events led to the Partitions of Poland.

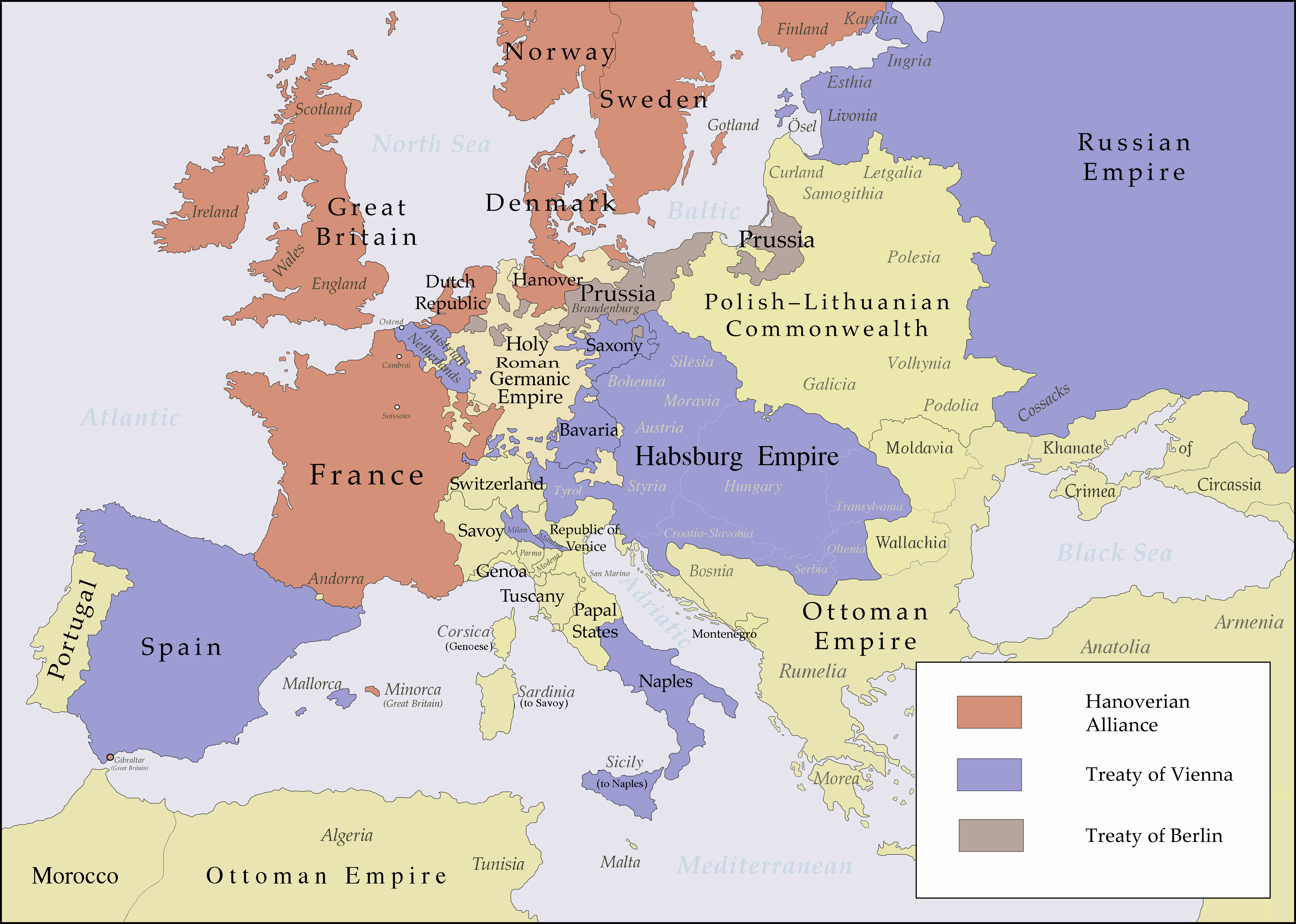
European alliances in the 1720s

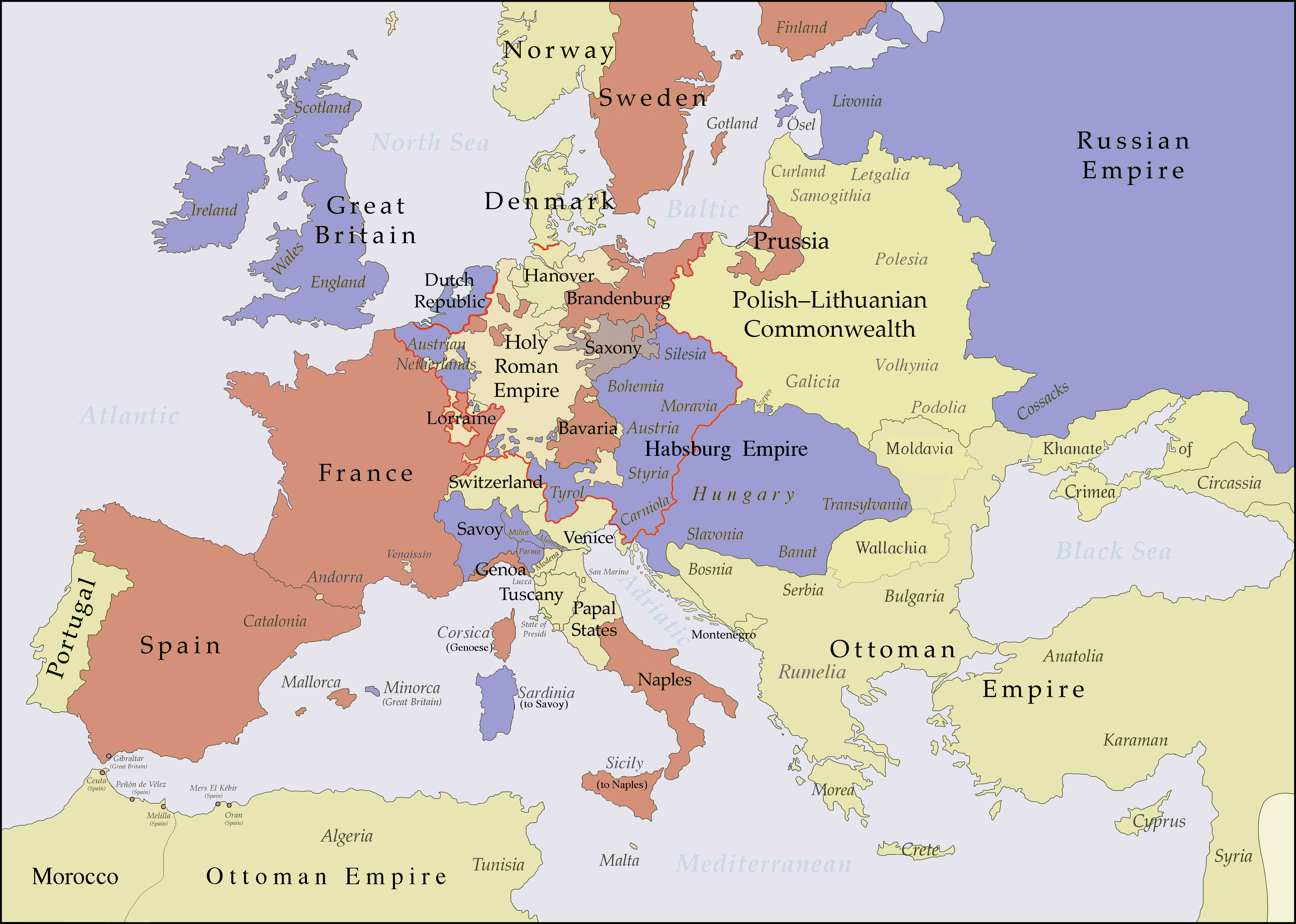
European alliances in the 1740

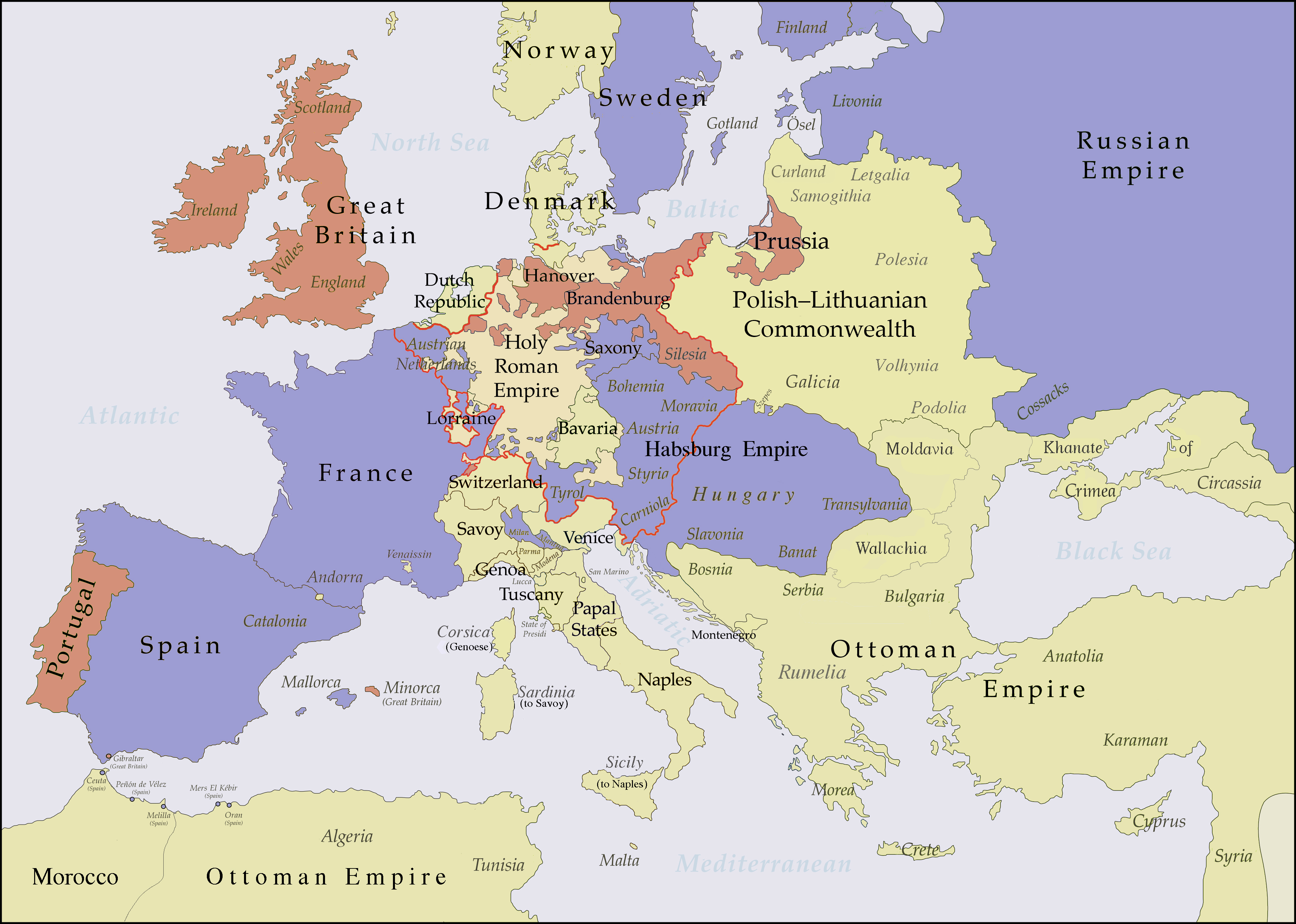
European alliances in the mid-18th century

== Decline ==
The concept began to fade in the second half of the 18th century, as Britain and France became the dominant European powers. The failure to prevent the Seven Years' War, in which over a million died, was a major factor. One of the most successful alliances in the second half of the century was the Bourbon Family Compact between France and Spain, which survived several major European conflicts, including the Wars of Austrian and Polish Successions and the Seven Years' War, and outlasted the American War of Independence, in which French and Spanish support contributed to British defeat, as states began to seek more stable and long-lasting alliances.

Alliances formed by the German Empire under Otto von Bismarck

Most European powers formed Coalitions against the French Republic. After the Napoleonic Wars, a Concert of Europe was set up to create a forum for discussion rather than create shifting alliance patterns, which had a tendency to cause major wars. This was successful through most of the 19th century, until World War I collapsed the post-Napoleonic system amid increasingly acute nationalist tensions, which led to the unification of Germany and Italy, ending with the deposition of the Hohenzollerns in Germany and the collapse of the Austrian, Russian, and Ottoman Empires.

== See also ==
- Treaty of Versailles (1756), the document establishing an alliance between Austria and France
- Treaty of Paris (1763), one of the treaties which ended the Seven Years' War
