= Golden Cavalry of St George =

British war subsidy to other states

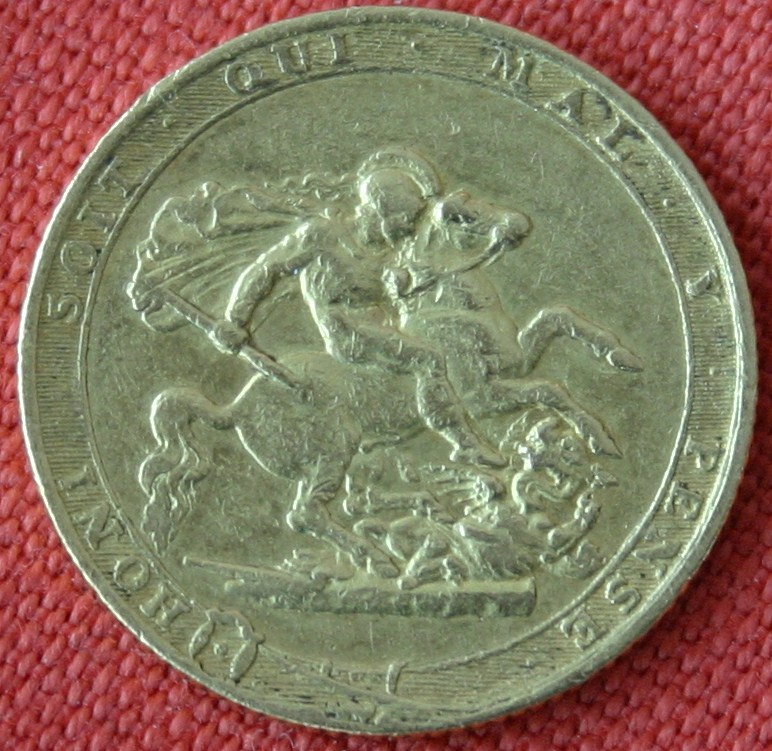
Reverse of an 1817 sovereign.

The Golden Cavalry of St George (also known as Pitt's Cavalry) was the colloquial name of subsidies paid out by the British government to other states in Europe in the 18th and the 19th centuries, particularly during the Napoleonic Wars. The name is a euphemism and derives from the British sovereign gold coins often used in those payments, which bore an image of Saint George, the patron saint of England, on horseback slaying the dragon.

== 18th Century ==
Beginning in the late 17th century, London became a major financial centre. The founding of the Bank of England and other financial houses (such as Lloyd's of London), combined with increased trade with British colonies and other nations, resulted in a great concentration of wealth in and around the city.

The British, with their large navy (the result of an island location) and small army (from having no land borders) were unable and disinclined to make large-scale commitments of troops on the European continent in the 18th century. They sought to offset the disadvantage of this in European wars by allying themselves with one or more continental powers (with substantial armies) whose interests were aligned with Britain's. By subsidising the armies of continental allies, Britain could turn London's enormous financial power to military advantage. During the War of the Austrian Succession, Britain kept Austria afloat with large subsidies owing to the Anglo-Austrian Alliance.

In the Seven Years' War, Britain did the same for Prussia, which was now allied against the Austrians. The Anglo-Prussian Convention, signed in April 1758, guaranteed Prussia a payment of £670,000 a year.

== Napoleonic Wars ==
During the Napoleonic Wars, a number of states in Europe were allied with the British against France. Britain, with its large navy but small army, was unable to deploy major forces on the Continent. However, Britain was a wealthy commercial power and in a position to pay out millions of pounds to Allied nations, which could field much larger armies against the French. An example is the £1,500,000 paid to Austria to commit troops to the campaign against France in the Austrian Netherlands in 1793, an expedition to which the British could contribute only men. Adjusted for inflation, this is equivalent to £273,000,000 in 2011.

Large sums were made available for the purpose, sometimes as formal subsidies and sometimes as bribes for European statesmen. It was partly funded by the introduction of the income tax by Prime Minister William Pitt the Younger. The policy was extremely costly but ultimately proved successful, as a coalition of European nations eventually defeated France in 1814.

== Later years ==
In more recent times T. E. Lawrence ("Lawrence of Arabia") is reported to have made payments of gold sovereigns to Arab soldiers during the Arab Revolt in return for their co-operation. He was nicknamed in Arabic Abu Khayyal, meaning "father of the horsemen".

During World War II, the Cavalry of St George was a euphemism for large-scale bribery of Spanish officials in Francisco Franco's dictatorship to prevent Spain from joining the Germans in the war.

== Sources ==
- Esdaile, Charles. The Peninsular War. Penguin Books (2003)
- Hague, William. William Pitt The Young. Perennial (2005)
- Harvey, Robert. The War of Wars: The Great European Conflict, 1793-1815. Robinson (2007)
- Schweizer, Karl W. (1989). England, Prussia, and the Seven Years War: Studies in Alliance Policies and Diplomacy. Lewiston, New York: Edwin Mellen Press. ISBN 978-0-88946-465-0.
