= Gundaker Thomas Starhemberg =

Austrian politician (1663–1745)

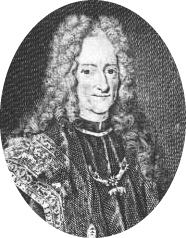
Gundaker Thomas Starhemberg

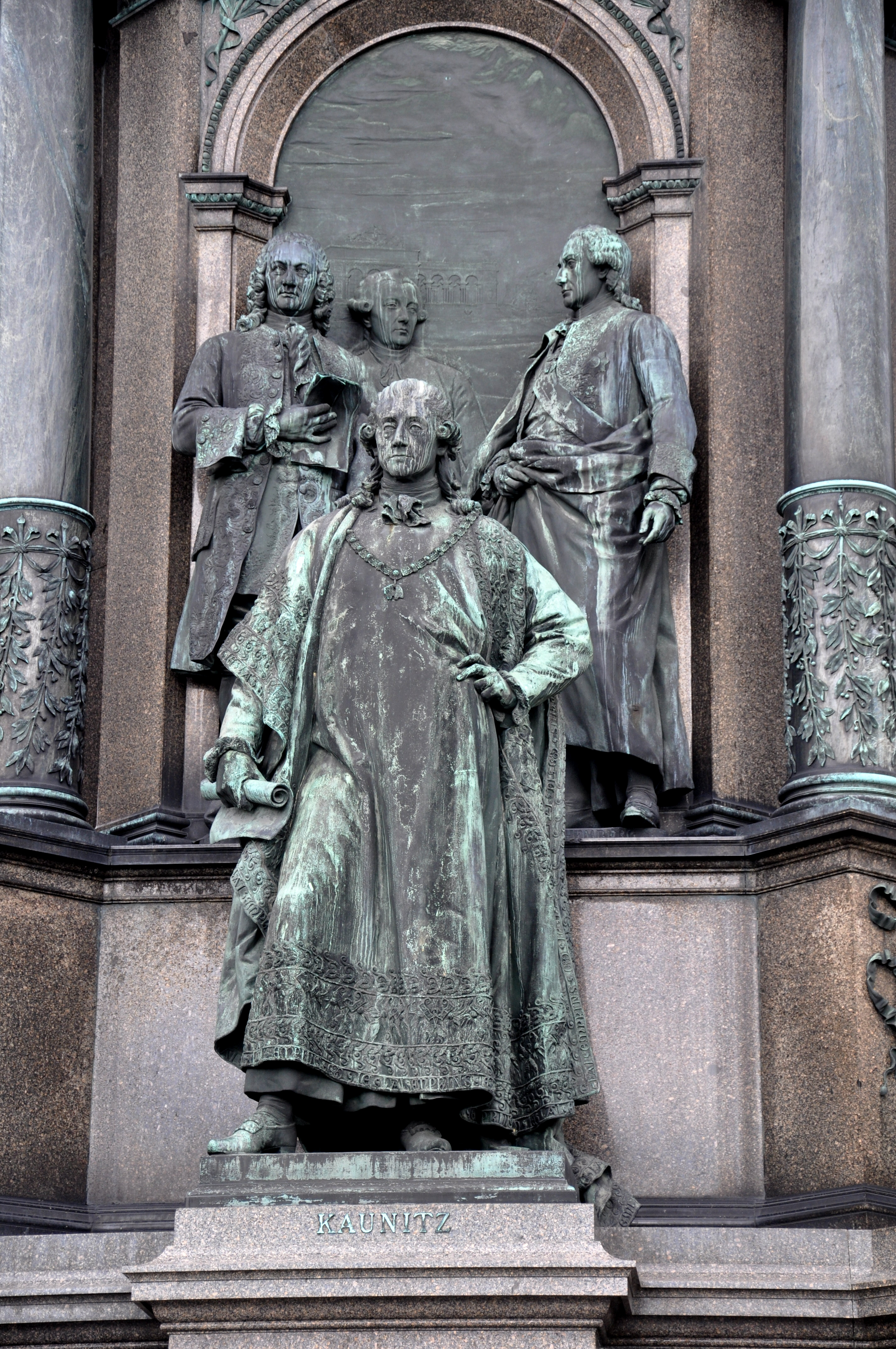
Starhemberg (top center) as one of the 4 advisors on the Maria-Theresia Memorial in Vienna

Gundaker Thomas Graf von Starhemberg (Vienna, December 14, 1663 – Prague, July 8, 1745) was an Austrian nobleman, politician and economist.

== Early life ==
His parents were Konrad Balthasar von Starhemberg (1612–1687) and his second wife, Countess Franziska Katharina Cavriani (1640-1716). His half-brothers were Ernst Rüdiger von Starhemberg (1638–1701), the defender of Vienna against the Turks in 1683 and Maximilian Lorenz von Starhemberg (1640–1689). Field Marshal Guido von Starhemberg was his cousin.

== Biography ==
Gundakar was designated early for an ecclesiastical career, but after studying a while at the Collegium Germanicum et Hungaricum, he returned to Vienna and entered the service of the Austrian Emperor.

He was quickly noticed for his financial talents and became a protégé of Prince Eugene of Savoy, who urged for financial reforms to finance the many wars the Empire was waging. Gundakar became vice-president of the Hofkammer (Court Chamber) in 1698 and its president in 1703, and was president of the Ministerial Bank Deputation from 1706 until his death. In 1712 he also became a member of the Privy Conference, and in 1716 a member of the Privy Financial Conference.

He returned to service in the crisis period after the death of Charles VI and prevented the financial collapse of the empire.

== Marriage and children ==
He married first on 13 January 1688 with Countess Beatrix Franziska von Daun (1665-1701), daughter of Field Marshal Wirich Philipp von Daun. They had:

- Maria Josepha (1689–1767)
- Franz (1691–1743), whose daughter Eleonore would marry Wenzel Anton, Prince of Kaunitz-Rietberg
- Maria Theresia (1694–1752)

After the death of his wife, he remarried on 3 February 1707 with Countess Maria Josepha Irene Jörger zu Tollet (1668-1746), and had 2 more daughters:

- Marie Gabrielle (1707–1793), married Prince Rudolph Joseph von Colloredo (1706-1788)
- Maria Dominika (1710–1736)

== Sources ==
- Vienna History
- Austria Forum
