= Battle of Condore =

1758 battle

- Part of Seven Years' War
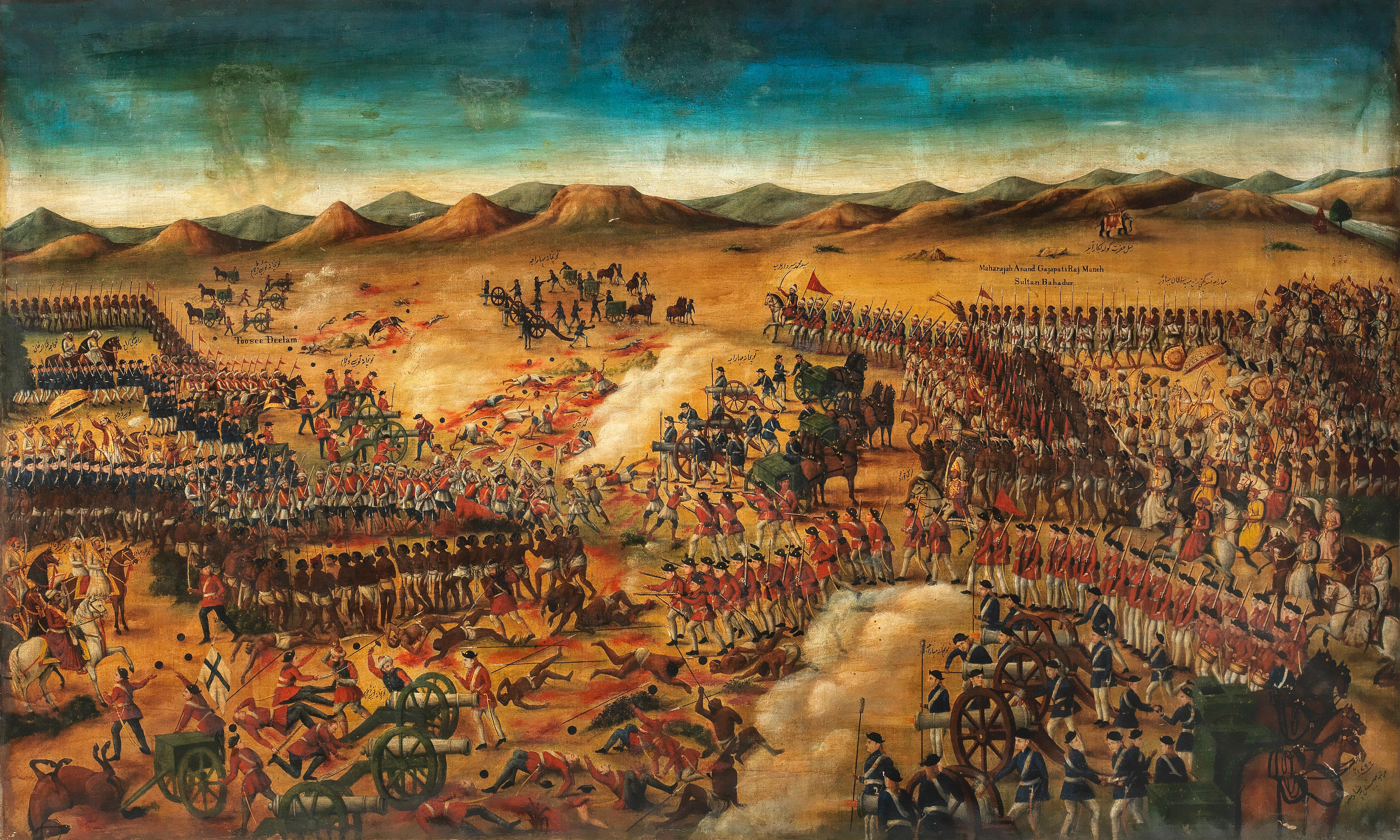
- South Indian painting depicting the Battle of Condore, probably mid-19th century
Date	9 December 1758
Location	Condore, India 16.1844°N 81.1349°E
Result	British victory

Belligerents
British East India Company	French East India Company

Commanders and leaders
Lt. Col. Francis Forde	Marquis de Conflans

Strength
7,600 infantry 500 cavalry 6 cannon	6,500 infantry 2,000 Native levies no cavalry at least 30 cannon

The Battle of Condore took place near Masulipatam on 9 December 1758 during the Third Carnatic War, part of the Seven Years' War. An Anglo-Indian force under the command of Colonel Francis Forde attacked and defeated a similarly sized French force under the command of Hubert de Brienne, Comte de Conflans, capturing all their baggage and artillery. The victory allowed the British to lay siege to Masulipatam, which they stormed on 25 January 1759.

== Bibliography ==
- Harvey, Robert. Clive: The Life and Death of a British Emperor. Sceptre, 1999.
- Henty, George Alfred. With Clive in India. Or, The Beginnings of an Empire.
- Keay, John. The Honourable Company: A History of the English East India Company. Harper Collins, 1993
- McLynn, Frank. 1759: The Year Britain Became Master of the World. Pimlico, 2005.
