= Great Britain in the Seven Years' War =

Role Great Britain played in the Seven Years' War

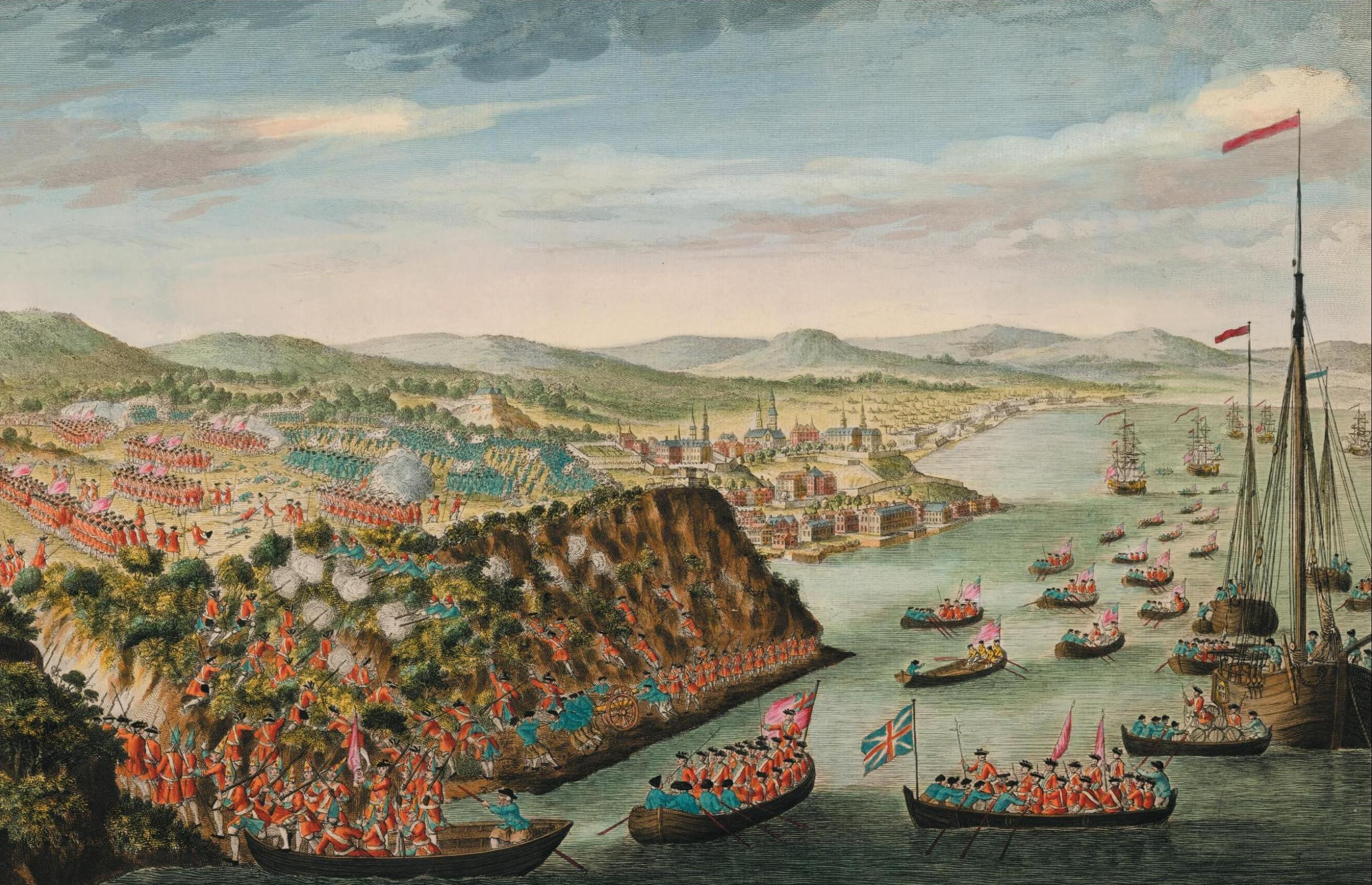
James Wolfe's victory at the Battle of Quebec in 1759

Great Britain was one of the major participants in the Seven Years' War, which for Britain in fact lasted nine years, between 1754 and 1763. British involvement in the conflict began in 1754 in what became known as the French and Indian War. However the warfare in the European theatre involving countries other than Britain and France commenced in 1756 (hence the name "Seven Years' War"). Britain emerged from the war as the world's leading colonial power, having gained all of New France in North America, ending France's role as a colonial power there. Following Spain's entry in the war in alliance with France in the third Family Compact, Britain captured the major Spanish ports of Havana, Cuba and Manila, in the Philippines in 1762, and agreed to return them in exchange for Spanish Florida. The Treaty of Paris in 1763 formally ended the conflict and Britain established itself as the world's pre-eminent naval power.

The war started poorly for Britain, at the hands of France in North America during 1754–1755, and in the fall of Menorca in 1756. The same year Britain's major ally Austria switched sides and aligned itself with France, and Britain was hastily forced to conclude a new alliance with Frederick the Great's Prussia. For the next seven years these two nations were ranged against a growing number of enemy powers led by France. After a period of political instability, the rise of a government headed by the Duke of Newcastle and William Pitt the Elder provided Britain with firmer leadership, enabling it to consolidate and achieve its war aims.

In 1759, Britain enjoyed an Annus Mirabilis, with success over the French on the continent (Germany), in North America (capturing the capital of New France), and in India. In 1761, Britain also came into conflict with Spain. The following year British forces captured Havana and Manila, the western and eastern capitals of the Spanish Empire, and repulsed a Spanish invasion of Portugal. By this time the Pitt-Newcastle ministry had collapsed, Britain was short of credit and the generous peace terms offered by France and its allies were accepted.

Through the crown, Britain was allied to the Kingdom of Ireland and the Electorate of Hanover, both of which effectively fell under British military command throughout the war. It also directed the military strategy of its various colonies around the world including British America. In India, British possessions were administered by the East India Company.

== Background ==
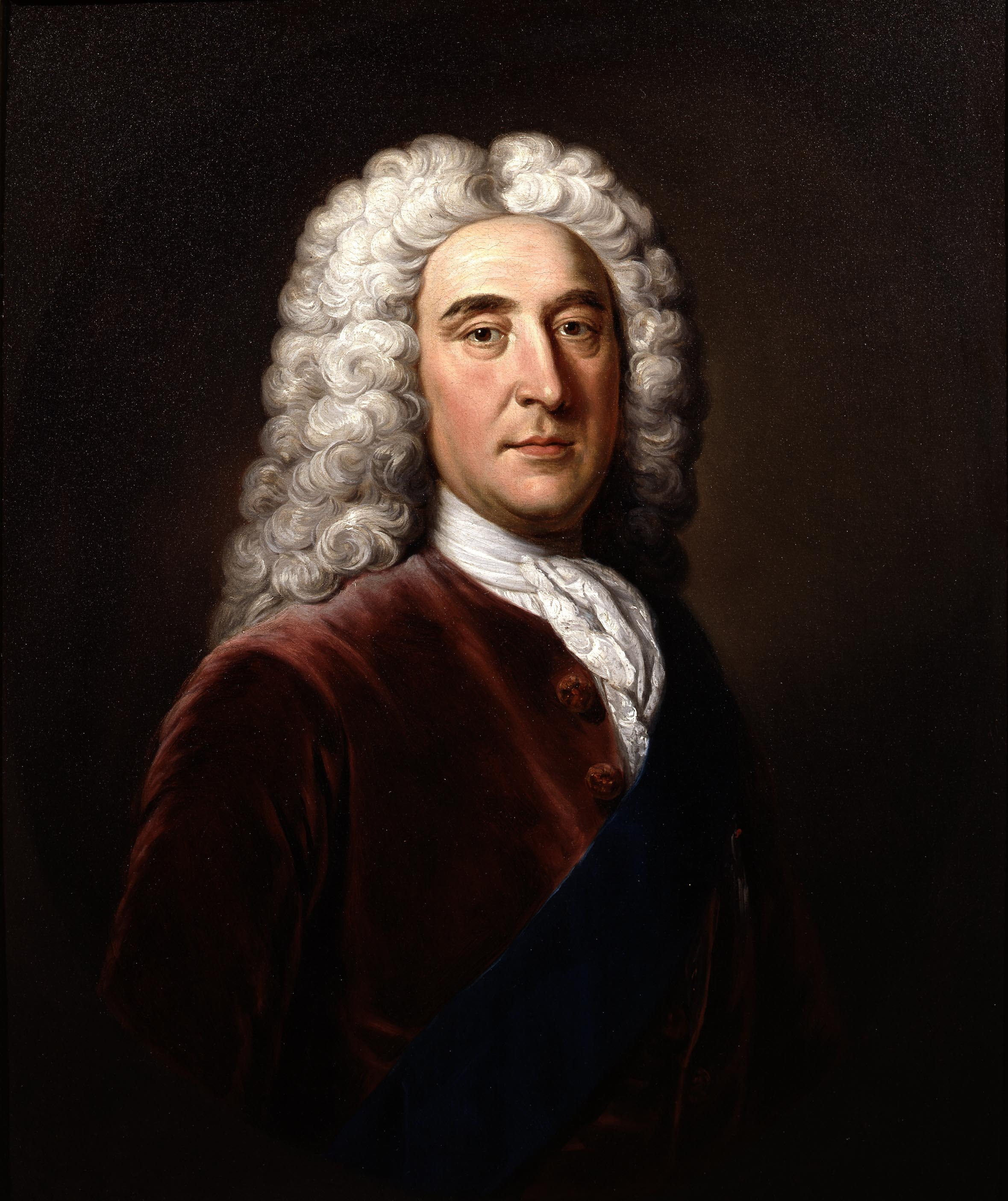
The Thomas Pelham-Holles, 1st Duke of Newcastle succeeded his younger brother as Prime Minister in 1754 and managed domestic affairs for much of the Seven Years' War.

The last major conflict in Europe, the War of the Austrian Succession, had ended in 1748 with the Treaty of Aix-la-Chapelle after a bloody war had left large parts of Central Europe devastated. The peace terms were unpopular with many, however, as they largely retained the status quo, which led the people of states such as France, Britain and Austria to believe that they had not made sufficient gains for their efforts in the war. By the early 1750s, many saw another major war as imminent, and Austria was preparing its forces for an attempt to retake Silesia from Prussia.

The British Prime Minister, Thomas Pelham-Holles, 1st Duke of Newcastle, had acceded to the premiership in 1754 after the sudden death of his brother Henry Pelham and led a government made up largely of Whigs. Newcastle had thirty years of experience as a Secretary of State and was a leading figure on the diplomatic scene.

Despite enjoying a comfortable majority in the House of Commons, Newcastle was extremely cautious and vulnerable to attacks led by men such as William Pitt, the leader of the Patriot Whigs. Newcastle fervently believed that peace in Europe was possible so long as the "Old System", a structure of alliances with European powers in which Britain had formed grand coalitions against Bourbon ambitions in Europe, as well as the alliance with Austria, prevailed, and he devoted much of his efforts to the continuance of his policy.

One of the major concerns for the British government of the era was colonial expansion. During the 18th century, the British colonies in North America had become more populous and powerful and were agitating to expand westwards into the American interior. The territory that was most prized by the new settlers was the Ohio Country, which was also claimed by France. It had economic potential and was considered a strategically-key territory since French control would block British expansion westwards, and French territory would eventually surround the British colonies and pin them against the coast. A number of colonial delegations to London urged the government to take more decisive action in the Ohio dispute.

In the wars of the time, the British tended to avoid large-scale commitments of troops on Continental Europe.They sought to offset the disadvantage of this in Europe by allying themselves with one or more continental powers whose interests were antithetical to those of their enemies, particularly France. By subsidising the armies of continental allies, Britain could turn London's enormous financial power to military advantage.

During the Seven Years' War, the British chose as their principal partner the most brilliant general of the day, Frederick the Great of Prussia, which was the rising power in Central Europe, and paid Frederick substantial subsidies for his campaigns.That was accomplished in the Diplomatic Revolution of 1756 in which Britain ended its long-standing alliance with Austria in favour of Prussia, which left Austria to side with France. In marked contrast to France's strategy, Britain strove to prosecute the war actively in the colonies and took full advantage of its naval power. The British pursued a dual strategy of naval blockade and bombardment of enemy ports, combined with rapid movement of troops by sea. They harassed enemy shipping and attacked enemy colonies and frequently used colonists from nearby British colonies in the effort.

== War in North America ==
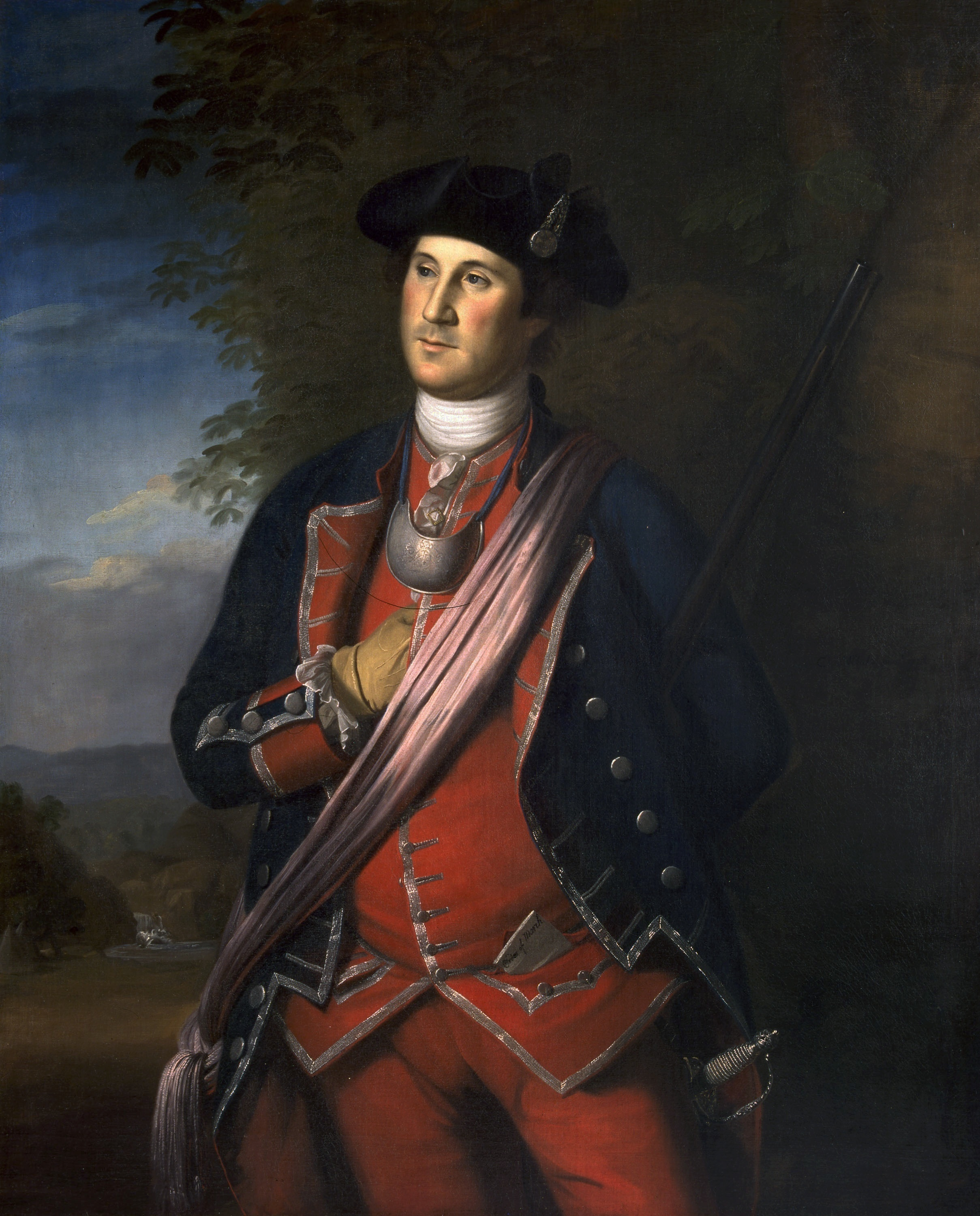
As an officer of the Virginia Regiment, George Washington played a major role in Britain's campaign in the early stages of the Seven Years' War.

=== Initial skirmishes (1754–1755) ===
The Ohio Country located between Britain's Thirteen Colonies and France's New France saw France and Britain clash. In 1753, the French sent an expedition south from Montreal that began constructing forts in the upper reaches of the Ohio River. In 1754, the Province of Virginia sent the Virginia Regiment led by George Washington to the area to assist in the construction of a British fort at present-day Pittsburgh, but the larger French force had driven away a smaller British advance party and built Fort Duquesne. Washington and some native allies ambushed a company of French scouts at the Battle of Jumonville Glen in late May 1754. In the skirmish the French envoy Joseph Coulon de Jumonville was left dead leading to a diplomatic incident. The French responded in force from Fort Duquesne, and in July Washington was forced to surrender at the Battle of Fort Necessity. Despite the conflict between them, the two nations were not yet formally at war.

=== Braddock Expedition (1755) ===
The government in Britain, realising that the existing forces of America were insufficient, drew up a plan to dispatch two battalions of Irish regular troops under General Edward Braddock and intended to massively increase the number of Provincial American forces. A number of expeditions were planned to give the British the upper hand in North America including a plan for New England troops to capture Fort Beauséjour and Fortress Louisbourg in Acadia, and others to act against Fort Niagara and Fort Saint-Frédéric from Albany, New York. The largest operation was a plan for Braddock to dislodge the French from the Ohio Country.

In May 1755, Braddock's column blundered into an enemy force composed of French and Native Americans at the Battle of the Monongahela near Fort Duquesne. After several hours' fighting the British were defeated and forced to retreat, Braddock died a few days later of his wounds. The remainder of his force returned to Philadelphia and took up quarters, intending no further action that year. The French remained in control of the Ohio Country.

In the maritime theatre, the British were successful in the Battle of Fort Beauséjour and in their campaign to remove the French military threat from Acadia. After the battle the British began the Great Expulsion called the Bay of Fundy Campaign (1755) by the British, with the intent of preventing Acadian support of the French supply lines to Louisbourg. The British forcibly relocated 12,000 French-speakers. Two additional expeditions from Albany each failed to reach their objectives, although one, William Johnson's expedition, did establish Fort William Henry and held off a French attempt on Fort Edward in the Battle of Lake George.

When news of the Braddock disaster reached Britain it caused a massive public outcry over the government's poor military preparation. The government appointed William Shirley as the new commander-in-chief in North America, and planned an equally ambitious series of operations for the following year.

=== Further struggles in North America (1756–1758) ===
Map showing the possessions in 1750 of Britain (pink and purple), France (blue), and Spain (orange) in North America

Britain and France continued to clash, each with increasingly large forces. Even though the inhabitants of the British colonies hugely outnumbered those of New France, they were unable to exercise this advantage, partly due to a successful campaign by the French to recruit Native American allies who raided the unprotected frontier of the Thirteen Colonies. The British raised regiments of local militia and shipped in more regular forces from Britain and Ireland.

Despite these increased forces Britain continued to fare badly in the battle for control of the Ohio Country and the nearby Great Lakes, and none of their campaigns was successful in 1756. After losing the Battle of Fort Oswego, not only that fort, but others in the Mohawk River valley were abandoned. This was followed in 1757 by the fall of Fort William Henry and the Indian atrocities that followed. News of this disaster sent a fresh wave of panic around the British colonies, and the entire militia of New England was mobilised overnight.

In the maritime theatre, a raid was organized on Lunenburg, Nova Scotia and several on the Chignecto. A British attempt to take Louisbourg in 1757 failed due to bad weather and poor planning. The following year, in part because of having expelled many Acadians, the Siege of Louisbourg (1758) succeeded, clearing the way for an advance on Quebec. Immediately after the fall of Louisbourg the expulsion of the Acadians continued with the removal of Acadians in the St. John River Campaign, the Petitcodiac River Campaign, the Ile Saint-Jean Campaign, and the Gulf of St. Lawrence Campaign (1758).

By this point, the war in North America had reached a stalemate, with France broadly holding the territorial advantage. It held possession of the disputed Ohio territory but lacked the strength to launch an attack on the more populous British coastal colonies.

One of the most significant geopolitical actions of the time was the slow movement towards unity in North America started by delegates of seven British North American colonies at the Albany Congress. Although delegates rejected a Plan of Union proposed by Benjamin Franklin, those seven colonies did combine to fight the War of Independence in which 13 British colonies (but not those of present-day Canada) seceded from the British Empire, eventually to form the United States of America.

== War in Europe (1756–1759) ==
=== Stately Quadrille ===
Britain had been allied to Austria since 1731, and the cooperation between the two states had peaked during the War of the Austrian Succession when Maria Theresa had been able to retain her throne with British assistance. Since then the relationship had weakened—as Austria was dissatisfied with the terms negotiated by Britain for them at the Treaty of Aix-la-Chapelle. Prussia had captured Silesia from Austria during the war and Austria wanted British help to recover it. Sensing that it would not be forthcoming, the Austrians approached their historical enemy France and made a defensive treaty with her—thereby dissolving the twenty-five-year Anglo-Austrian Alliance.

Alarmed by the sudden switch in the European balance of power the British made a similar agreement with Prussia at the Westminster Convention. By doing this Newcastle hoped to rebalance the two sides in central Europe—and thereby make a war potentially mutually destructive to all. This he hoped would stop either Austria or Prussia making an attack on the other and would prevent an all-out war in Europe. This would allow Britain and France to continue their colonial skirmishes without formal war being declared in Europe. Frederick the Great had a number of supporters in London, including William Pitt, who welcomed the rapprochement between Britain and Prussia. The Dutch Republic, a long-standing ally of Britain, declared its neutrality in the wake of the Westminster Convention and had no active participation in the coming conflict.

=== Fall of Menorca ===
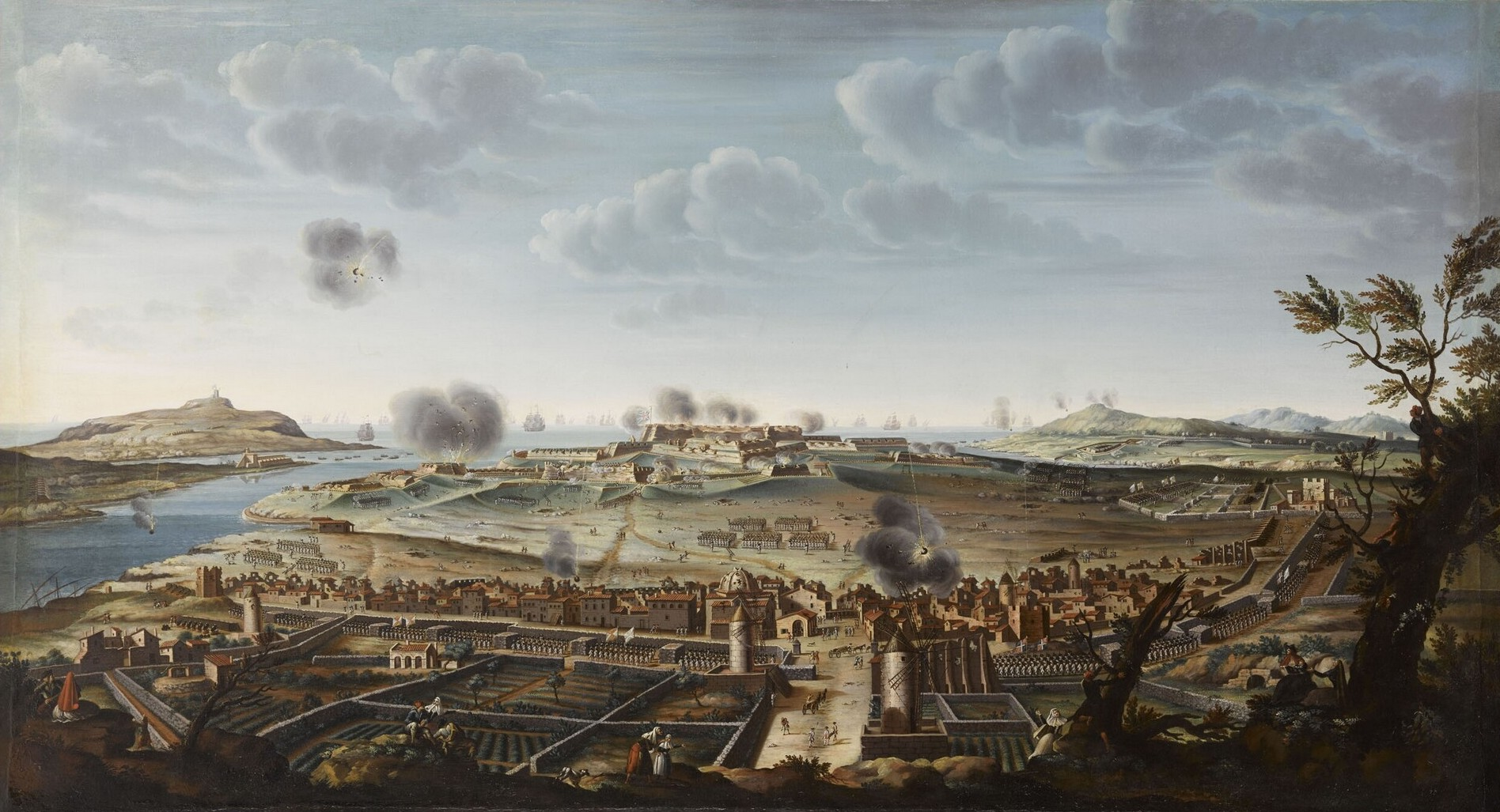
French siege and capture of Fort St. Philip on Menorca, 29 June 1756

As war in Europe appeared increasingly inevitable, the Newcastle government sought to take the initiative—and make sure that the strategic island of Menorca (historically called "Minorca" by the British) was secured before it fell into French hands. A relief expedition was dispatched under Admiral John Byng to save it. However, once he arrived in the Mediterranean Byng found a sizable French fleet and a 15,000-strong army besieging the fortress. After fighting an indecisive battle he withdrew to Gibraltar, and Menorca subsequently fell. Formal war was finally declared in May 1756, almost exactly two years after the two countries had first clashed in Ohio.

Byng was recalled to Britain and court-martialled. There was violent public outrage about the loss of Menorca, mostly directed against Newcastle. He tried to deflect the blame by emphasising the alleged cowardice of Byng. After being tried by his peers, the admiral was eventually executed by firing squad for "not doing his utmost". By that time Newcastle and his government had fallen. It was replaced by a weaker administration headed by William Cavendish, 4th Duke of Devonshire and dominated by William Pitt the Elder.

=== Prussian alliance ===
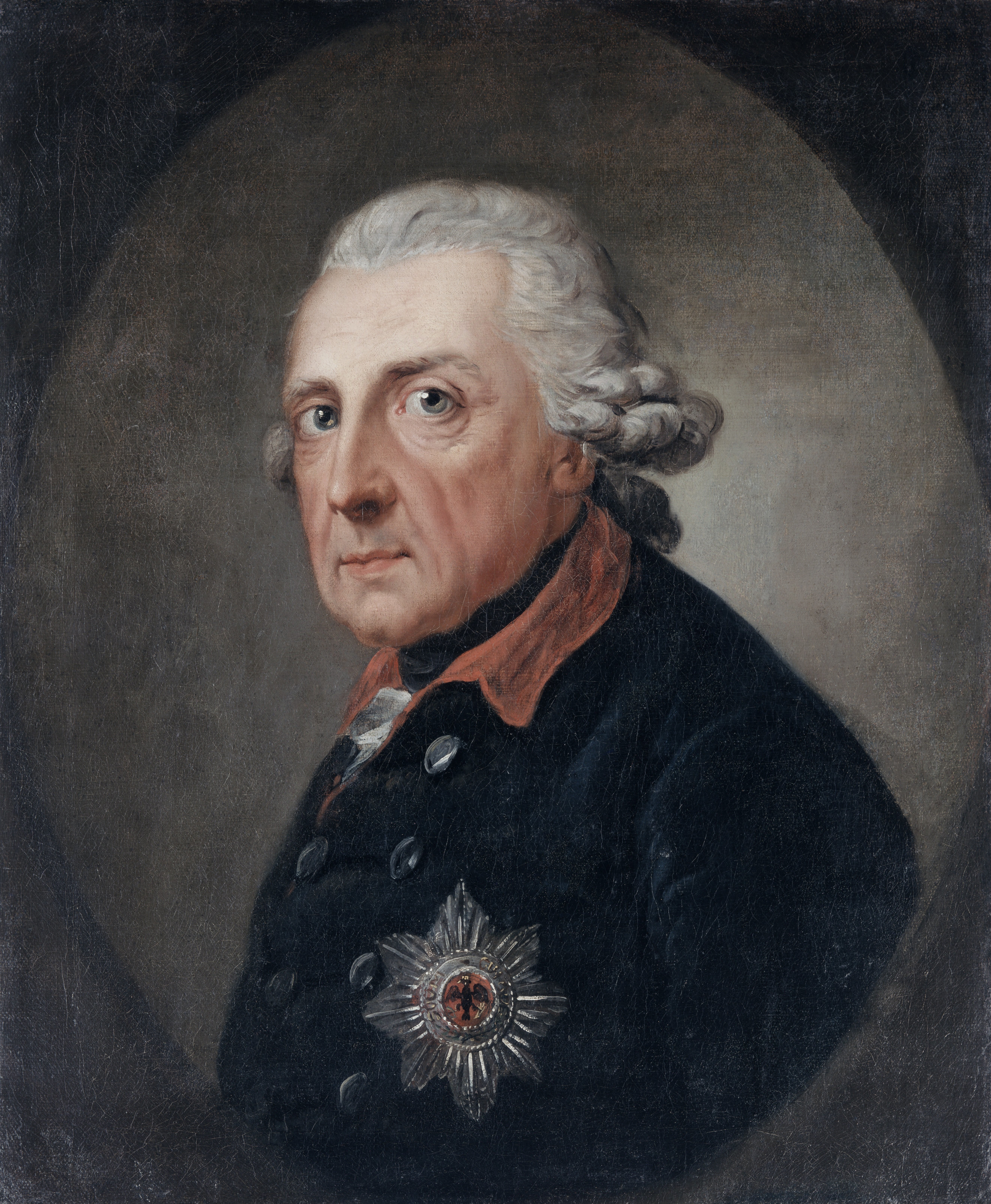
Frederick the Great remained Britain's only major ally throughout much of the War.

The major war in continental Europe that the British had hoped to avoid exploded in August 1756 when Frederick the Great attacked and overran the Austrian ally Saxony. Having occupied it he then launched a similarly bold invasion of Bohemia. In both cases the Prussians caught their Austrian enemies by surprise, and had used this advantage to full effect, capturing major objectives before Austrian troops had been fully mobilised. Having besieged Prague, an Austrian counter-attack and a defeat at the Battle of Kolín forced the Prussians back.

Britain found itself bound by the Westminster Convention and entered the war on the Prussian side. Newcastle was deeply reluctant to do this, but he saw that a Prussian collapse would be disastrous to British and Hanoverian interests. The Anglo-Prussian Alliance was established, which saw large amounts of subsidy given to Prussia. Some supporters of George II were strong advocates of support for Prussia, as they saw it would be impossible to defend his realm of Hanover if they were to be defeated. Despite his initial dislike of Frederick, the King later moved towards this viewpoint.

=== British intervention on the continent ===
Within a short time Prussia was being attacked on four fronts, by Austria from the south, France from the west, Russia from the east, and Sweden from the north. Frederick fought defensive actions trying to blunt the invaders, losing thousands of men and precious resources in the process. He began to send more urgent appeals to London for material help on the continent.

When the war with France had commenced, Britain had initially brought Hessian and Hanoverian troops to defend Britain from a feared invasion scare. When the threat of this receded, the German soldiers were sent to defend Hanover along with a small contingent of British troops under Duke of Cumberland, the King's second son. The arrival of British troops on the continent was considered a rarity, as the country preferred to make war by using its naval forces. As with the Prussians, Cumberland's army was initially overwhelmed by the sheer scale of the French attacks. Following the disastrous Battle of Hastenbeck, Cumberland was forced to sign the Convention of Klosterzeven by which Hanover would withdraw from the war—and large chunks of its territory would be occupied by the French for the duration of the conflict.

Prussia was extremely alarmed by this development and lobbied hard for it to be reversed. In London too, there was shock at such a capitulation and Pitt recalled Cumberland to London where he was publicly rebuked by his father, the King, and forced to relinquish his commission. The terms of Klosterzeven were revoked, Hanover re-entered the war—and a new commander was selected to command the Allied Anglo-German forces. Ferdinand of Brunswick was a brother-in-law of Frederick the Great, and had developed a reputation as a competent officer. He set about trying to rally the German troops under his command, by emphasising the extent of the atrocities committed by the French troops who had occupied Hanover, and launched a counter-offensive in late 1757 driving the French back across the Rhine.

Despite several British attempts to persuade them, the Dutch Republic refused to join their former allies in the war and remained neutral. Pitt at one point even feared that the Dutch would enter the war against Britain, in response to repeated violations of Dutch neutrality by the Royal Navy.Similarly, the British were wary of Denmark joining the war against them, but Copenhagen followed a policy of strict neutrality.

=== Change of government ===
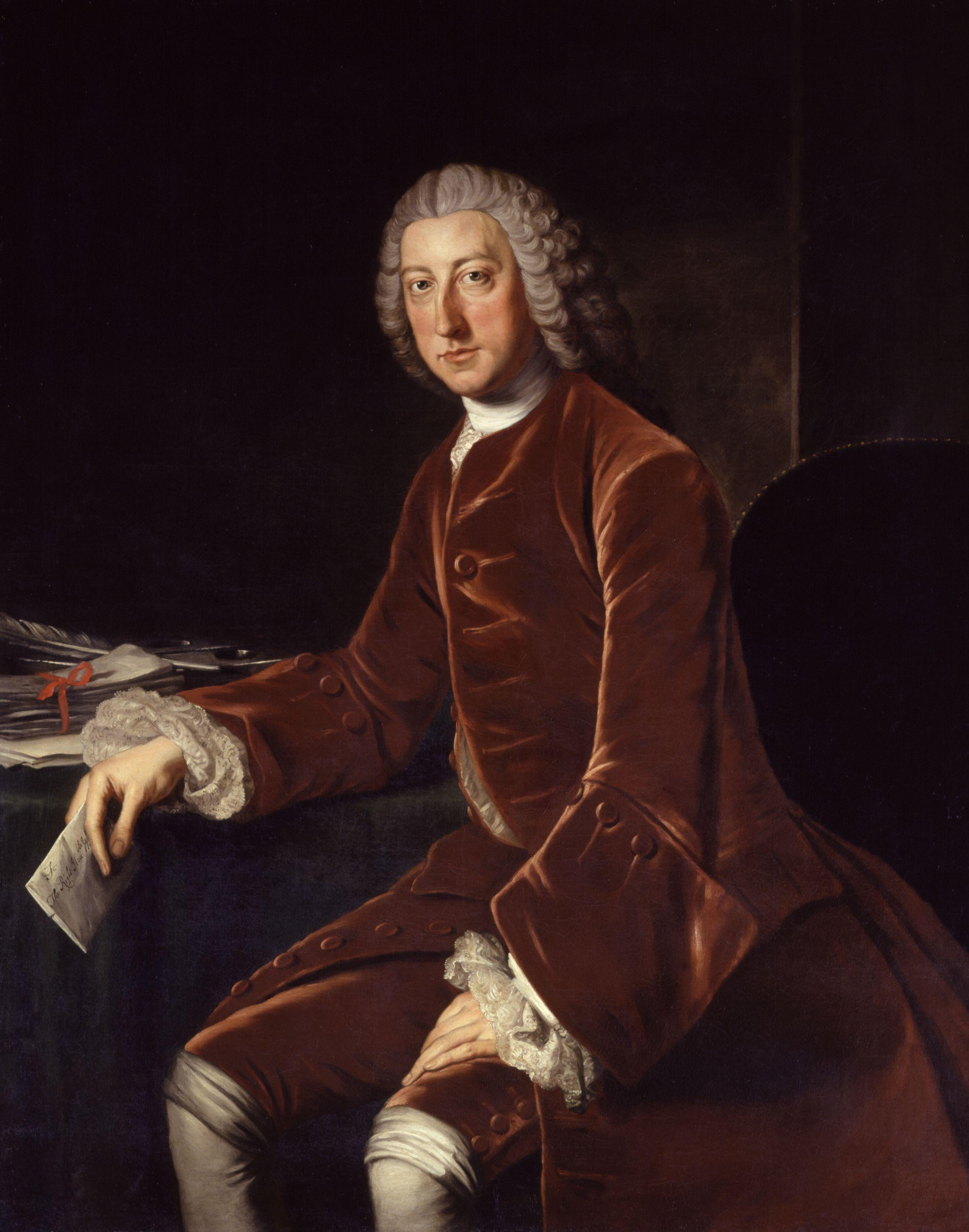
William Pitt the Elder was the leader of the Patriot Whigs and oversaw British strategy from 1757.

In London the Pitt-dominated administration had fallen after just six months because of a lack of support in parliament. A period of political stalemate followed, with no real direction to the British war effort. It became apparent that the only way a serious war administration could be put together was by an alliance of leading figures. In 1757, a partnership was formed between the Duke of Newcastle and William Pitt—despite their years of enmity. Newcastle became the head of the administration as Prime Minister, with control of public finances, while Pitt became Secretary of State and de facto war minister with control of much of British military strategy. Other leading figures such as Henry Fox (Paymaster of the Forces) and John Russell, 4th Duke of Bedford were also given positions in the administration.

The new government's strategic thinking was sharply divided. Pitt had been a long-term advocate of Britain playing as small a role on the European continent while concentrating their resources and naval power to strike against vulnerable French colonies. Newcastle remained an old-school continentalist, who believed that the war would be decided in Europe, and was convinced that a strong British presence there was essential. He was supported in this view by George II.

A compromise was eventually established in which Britain would keep troops on the European continent under the command of the Duke of Brunswick, while Pitt was given authority to launch several colonial expeditions. He sent forces to attack French settlements in West Africa and the West Indies, operations which were tactically successful and brought financial benefits. In Britain a popular surge of patriotism and support for the government resulted. Pitt formed a triumvirate to direct operations with George Anson in command of the navy and John Ligonier in charge of the army. A Militia Act was passed in 1757 to create a sizable force to defend Britain, which would free up regular troops for operations overseas.

=== Naval "descents" ===
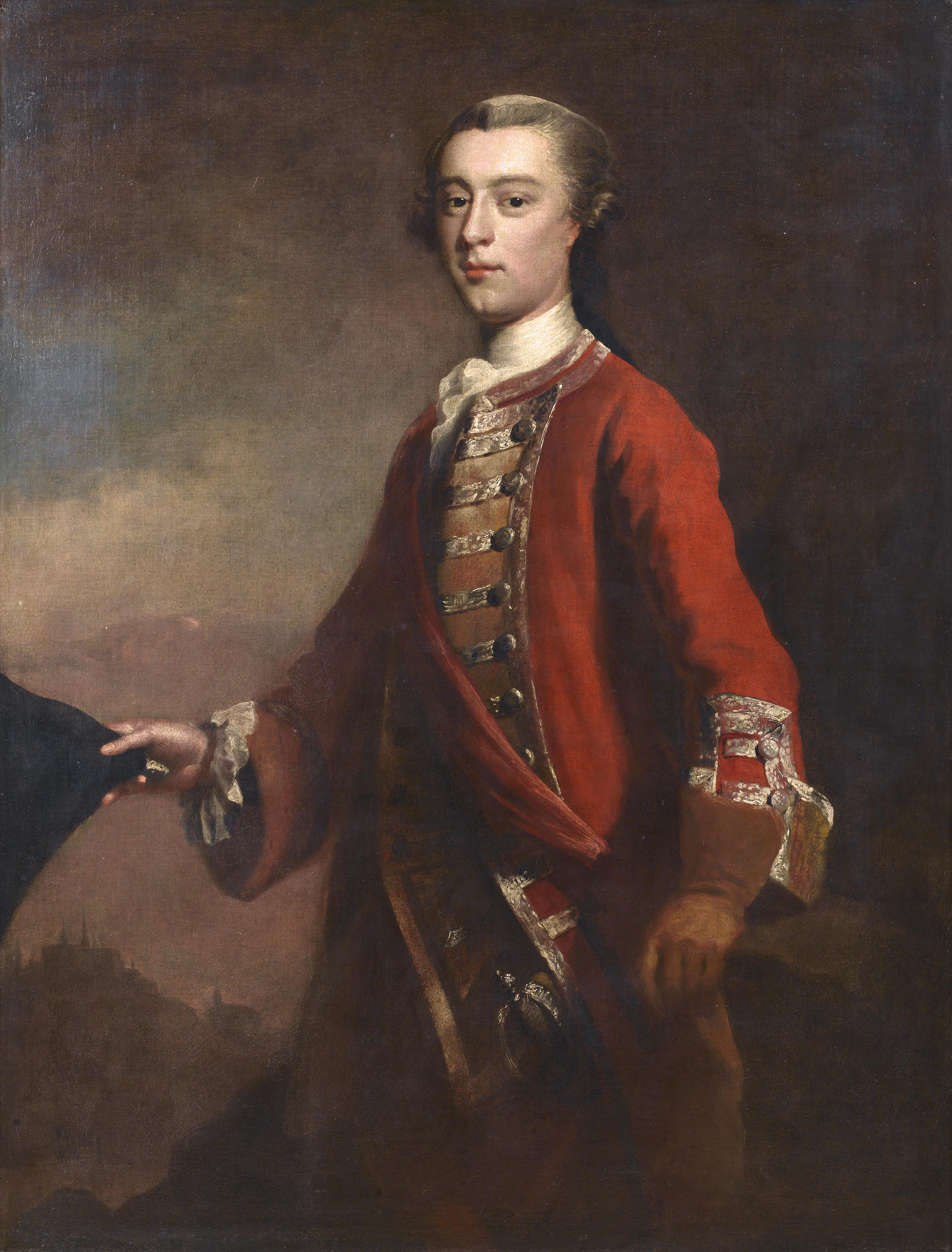
As a colonel James Wolfe participated in the 1757 raid on Rochefort. He soon rose to be a general, taking part in the seizure of Louisbourg and leading the British troops who captured Quebec in 1759.

The British had received several requests from their German allies to try to relieve the pressure on them by launching diversionary operations against the French. Pitt had long been an advocate of amphibious strikes or "descents" against the French coastline in which a small British force would land, capture a settlement, destroy its fortifications and munitions supplies and then withdraw. This would compel the French to withdraw troops from the Northern front to guard the coast.

After an urgent request from Brunswick, Pitt was able to put his plan into action, and in September 1757 a British raid was launched against Rochefort in western France. For various reasons it was not a success, but Pitt was determined to press ahead with similar raids. Another British expedition was organised under Lord Sackville. A landing in Saint-Malo was partially successful, but was cut short by the sudden appearance of French troops—and the force withdrew to Britain. Pitt organised a third major descent, under the command of Thomas Bligh. His raid on Cherbourg in August 1758 proved to be the most successful of the descents, as he burnt ships and munitions and destroyed the fortifications of the town. However, an attempt in September to do the same at Saint-Malo ended with the Battle of Saint Cast and the British withdrawing with heavy casualties. This proved to be the last of the major landings attempted on the French coast—though the British later took control of the Belle Île off the coast of Brittany which was used as a base for marshalling troops and supplies. The raids were not financially successful and were described by Henry Fox as being "like breaking windows with guineas". From then on the British concentrated their efforts in Europe on Germany.

== Indian campaign (1756–1758) ==
Britain and France both had significant colonial possessions in India and had been battling for supremacy for a number of years. The British were represented by the East India Company (EIC) who were permitted to raise troops. The collapse of the long-standing Mughal Empire brought the clash between the two states to a head, as each tried to gain sufficient power and territory to dominate the other. The 1754 Treaty of Pondicherry which ended the Second Carnatic War had brought a temporary truce to India, but it was soon under threat. A number of smaller Indian Princely states aligned with either Britain or France. One of the most assertive of these Princes was the pro-French Nawab of Bengal, Siraj ud-Daulah, who resented the British presence in Calcutta. In 1756, he had succeeded his grandfather Alivardi Khan who had been a staunch British ally. By contrast he regarded the British East India Company as an encroaching threat.

=== Calcutta ===
On 20 June 1756, the Nawab's troops stormed Fort William capturing the city. A number of the British civilians and prisoners of war were locked in the small guard room in what became known as the Black Hole of Calcutta. After the death of many of them, the atrocity became a popular rallying call for revenge. A force from Madras under the command of Lieutenant Colonel Robert Clive arrived and liberated the city, driving out the Nawab's troops. The Third Carnatic War that followed saw Britain ranged against the Nawab and France. Clive consolidated his position in Calcutta, and made contact with one of the Nawab's chief advisors Mir Jafar attempting to persuade him and other leading Bengalis to overthrow the Nawab. After the British ambushed a column of the Nawab's troops which was approaching Calcutta on 2 February 1757, the two sides agreed the Treaty of Alinagar which brought a temporary truce to Bengal.

=== Plassey ===
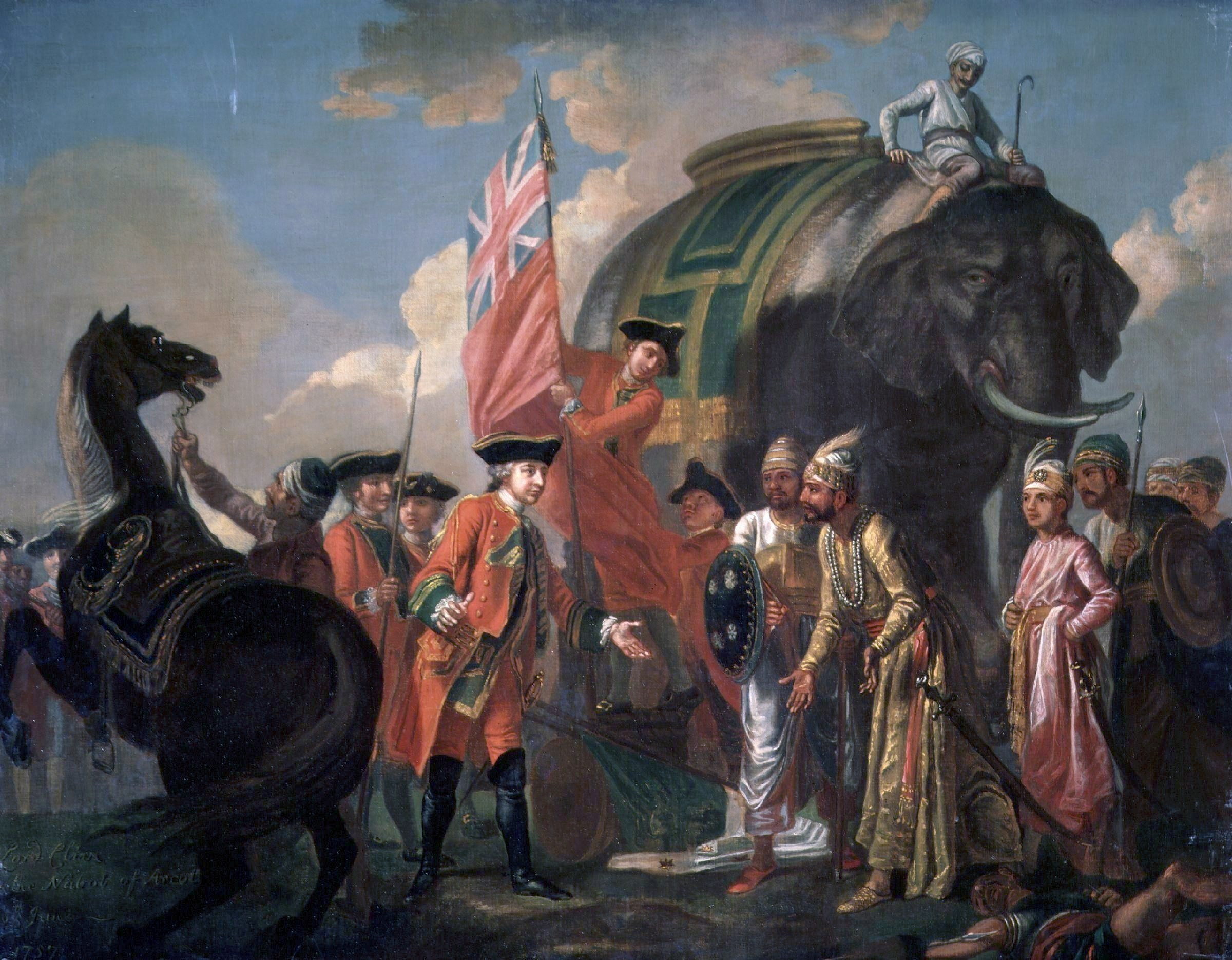
Robert Clive, meeting with Mir Jafar after the Battle of Plassey in 1757, by Francis Hayman

Despite the agreement at Alinagar, neither side was content with the status quo. The British felt that if they did not assert their position, the French would become the dominant power in Bengal. Siraj ud-Daulah was fearful of being forced to accept British suzerainty. His position was weakened by his unpopularity with his own subjects, and the threat of other military enemies to the west. He began to take steps to drive the British out of Bengal entirely.

On 23 June 1757 the Nawab led a force of 50,000 into the field. Ranged against them was a much smaller Anglo-Indian force under the command of Robert Clive. The Nawab was weakened by the betrayal of Mir Jafar who had concluded a secret pact with the British before the battle – and refused to move his troops to support the Nawab. Faced with the superior firepower and discipline of the British troops, the Nawab's army was routed. After the battle Siraj ud-Daulah was overthrown and executed by his own officers, and Mir Jafar succeeded him as Nawab. He then concluded a peace treaty with the British.

Mir Jafar himself subsequently clashed with the British for much the same reasons as Siraj ud-Daulah had. He conspired with the Dutch East India Company to try to oust the British from Bengal and in 1759 invited them to send troops to aid him. The defeat of the Dutch at the Battle of Chinsurah resulted in Britain moving to have Jafar replaced with his son-in-law, who was considered more favourable to the EIC. One of the most important long-term effects of the battle was that the British received the diwan – the right to collect taxes in Bengal which was granted in 1765 by Shah Alam II.

=== French East India Company ===
The French presence in India was led by the French East India Company operating out of its base at Pondicherry. Its forces were under the command of Joseph François Dupleix and Thomas Arthur, comte de Lally, a Jacobite. The veteran Dupleix had been in India a long time, and had established a key rapport with France's Indian allies. Lally was more newly arrived, and was seeking a swift victory over the British—and was less concerned about diplomatic sensibilities.

Following the Battle of Chandalore when Clive attacked a French trading post the French were driven completely out of Bengal. In spite of this they still had a major presence in central India, and hoped to regain the power they had lost to the British in southern India during the Second Carnatic War.

== Annus Mirabilis (1759) ==
The Annus Mirabilis of 1759 (Latin 'wonderful year') was a string of notable British victories over their French-led opponents during that year. Apart from a few isolated victories, the war had not gone well for Britain since 1754. In all theatres, except India and North America (where Pitt's strategy had led to important gains in 1758), they were on the retreat. British agents received information about a planned French invasion which would knock Britain out of the war completely. While France starved their colonial forces of troops and supplies to concentrate them on the goal of total strategic supremacy in Europe, the British government continued its policy of shipping their own troops to fight for total victory in the colonies—leaving Britain to be guarded by the large militia that had existed since 1757. The British had entered 1759 anxious about a planned French invasion, but by the end of the year, they were victorious in all theatres against France.

The succession of victories led Horace Walpole to remark, "Our bells are worn threadbare with ringing for victories". Several of the triumphs assumed an iconic place in the mindset of the British public, reinforced by representations in art and music, such as the popular song Heart of Oak and the later painting The Death of General Wolfe. Frank McLynn identified 1759 as the year which prefigured the rise of the British Empire in eclipsing France as the dominant global superpower. Much of the credit for the annus mirabilis was given to William Pitt the Elder, the minister who directed military strategy as part of his duties as Secretary of State for the Southern Department, rather than to the prime minister, the Duke of Newcastle. Recent historians, however, have portrayed the British Cabinet as a more collective leadership than had previously been thought. Three years later, Great Britain saw a similarly successful year. The Anglo-German army again turned back a French advance on Hanover at Wilhelmsthal, the army helped repulse a Franco-Spanish invasion of Portugal, captured Martinique from France, and captured Havana and Manila from Spain. This led some to describe 1762 as a "Second Annus Mirabilis".

=== Madras ===
Following Clive's victory at Plassey and the subjugation of Bengal, Britain had not directed large resources to the Indian theatre. The French meanwhile had dispatched a large force from Europe to seize the initiative on the subcontinent. The clear goal of this force was to capture Madras, which had previously fallen to the French in 1746. In December 1758 a French force of 8,000 under the Comte de Lally descended on Madras, bottling up the 4,000 British defenders in Fort St George. After a hard-fought three-month siege the French were finally forced to abandon their attempt to take the city by the arrival of a British naval force carrying 600 reinforcements on 16 February 1759. Lally withdrew his troops, but it was not the end of French ambitions in southern India.

=== West Indies ===
One of Pitt's favoured strategies was a British expedition to attack the French West Indies, where their richest sugar-producing colonies were situated. A British naval force of 9,000 sailed from Portsmouth in November 1758 under the command of Peregrine Hopson. Using Barbados as a staging point, they attacked first at Martinique. After failing to make enough headway, and losing troops rapidly to disease, they were forced to abandon the attempt and move to the secondary target of the British expedition, Guadeloupe. Facing a race against time before the hurricane season hit in July, a landing was forced and the town of Basse-Terre was shelled. They looked in severe danger when a large French fleet unexpectedly arrived under Bompart, but on 1 May the island's defenders finally surrendered and Bompart was unable to prevent the loss of Guadeloupe. Orders arrived from London concerning an assault on Saint Lucia but the commanders decided that such an attempt was unwise given the circumstances. Instead they moved to protect Antigua from any possible attack by Bompart, before the bulk of the force sailed for home in late July.

=== Battle of Minden ===
Since early 1758, the British had contributed an increasingly large number of troops to serve in Germany. Pitt had reversed his previous hostility to British intervention on the continent, as he realised that the theatre could be used to tie down numerous French troops and resources which might otherwise be sent to fight in the colonies. Brunswick's army had enjoyed enormous success since winter 1757, crossing the Rhine several times, winning the Battle of Krefeld and capturing Bremen without a shot being fired. In recognition of his services Parliament voted him £2,000 a year for life. By April 1759 Brunswick had an army of around 72,000 facing two French armies with a combined strength of 100,000. The French had occupied Frankfurt and were using it as their base for operations, which Brunswick now attempted to assault. On 13 April Brunswick lost the Battle of Bergen to a superior French force and was forced to retreat.

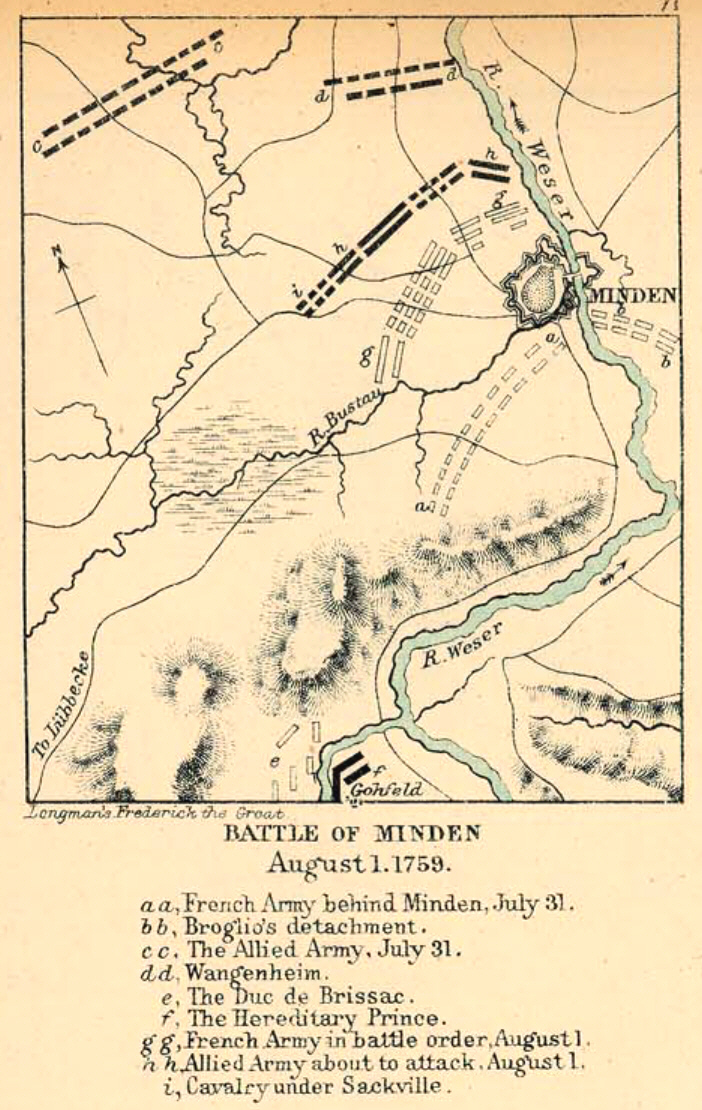
Battle plan of Minden

The French pursued Brunswick slowly, capturing the strategic town of Minden which could potentially be used to stage an invasion of Hanover. Brunswick was pressured into action by this threat; the French command was also eager to end the campaign with a swift victory to free up troops which would allow them to take part in the proposed invasion of Britain. On the night of 31 July, both commanders simultaneously decided to attack the other outside Minden. The French forces reacted hesitantly when faced with Germans in front of them as dawn broke, allowing the Allies to seize the initiative and counter-attack. However, one column of British troops advanced too quickly and soon found itself attacked on all sides by a mixture of cavalry, artillery and infantry which vastly outnumbered them. The British managed to hold them off, sustaining casualties of a third. When they were reinforced with other troops, the Allies broke through the French lines and forced them to retreat. The British cavalry under Sackville were ordered to advance, but he refused—apparently in indignation at his treatment by Brunswick, though this was at the time popularly attributed to cowardice on his part. In the confusion, the French were allowed to escape the battlefield and avoid total disaster. Despite widespread praise for the conduct of the British troops, their commander Sackville received condemnation for his alleged cowardice and was forced to return home in disgrace. He was replaced by the Marquess of Granby. The victory proved crucial, as Frederick had lost to the Russians at Kunersdorf. Had Brunswick been defeated at Minden, Hanover would almost certainly have been invaded and the total defeat of Prussia would have been imminent. In the wake of the victory the Allies advanced, pushing the French backwards and relieving the pressure on the Prussians.

=== Failed invasion ===
The central plank of France's war against Britain in 1759 was a plan to invade Britain, authored by the French chief minister Étienne François, duc de Choiseul. It was subject to several changes, but the core was that more than 50,000 French troops would cross the English Channel from Le Havre in flat-bottomed boats and land at Portsmouth on the British coast. Aided by a Jacobite rebellion – they would then advance on London and force a peace agreement on the British, extracting various concessions and knocking them out of the war. The British became aware through their agents of the scheme and drew up a plan to mobilise their forces in case of the invasion. In an effort to set back the invasion, a British raid was launched against Le Havre which destroyed numerous flat-boats and supplies. In spite of this, the plans continued to progress and by autumn the French were poised to launch their invasion. Following naval defeats at the Battle of Lagos and the Battle of Quiberon Bay, and with news of the Allied victory at Minden, the French began to have second thoughts about their plan, and in late autumn cancelled it. The French did not have the clear sea they hoped for the crossing, nor could they now spare the number of troops on the continent. A number of flaws in the plan had also become apparent, including the fact that claims of the number of Jacobite supporters were now considered wildly optimistic. The campaign was considered a last throw of the dice for the Jacobites to have any realistic hope of reclaiming the British throne. After the campaign the French soon abandoned the Stuarts entirely, withdrawing their support. Many of the Highland communities that had strongly supported the Jacobites in 1715 and 1745 now had regiments serving in the British Army, where they played a key role in Britain's success that year.

=== Naval supremacy ===
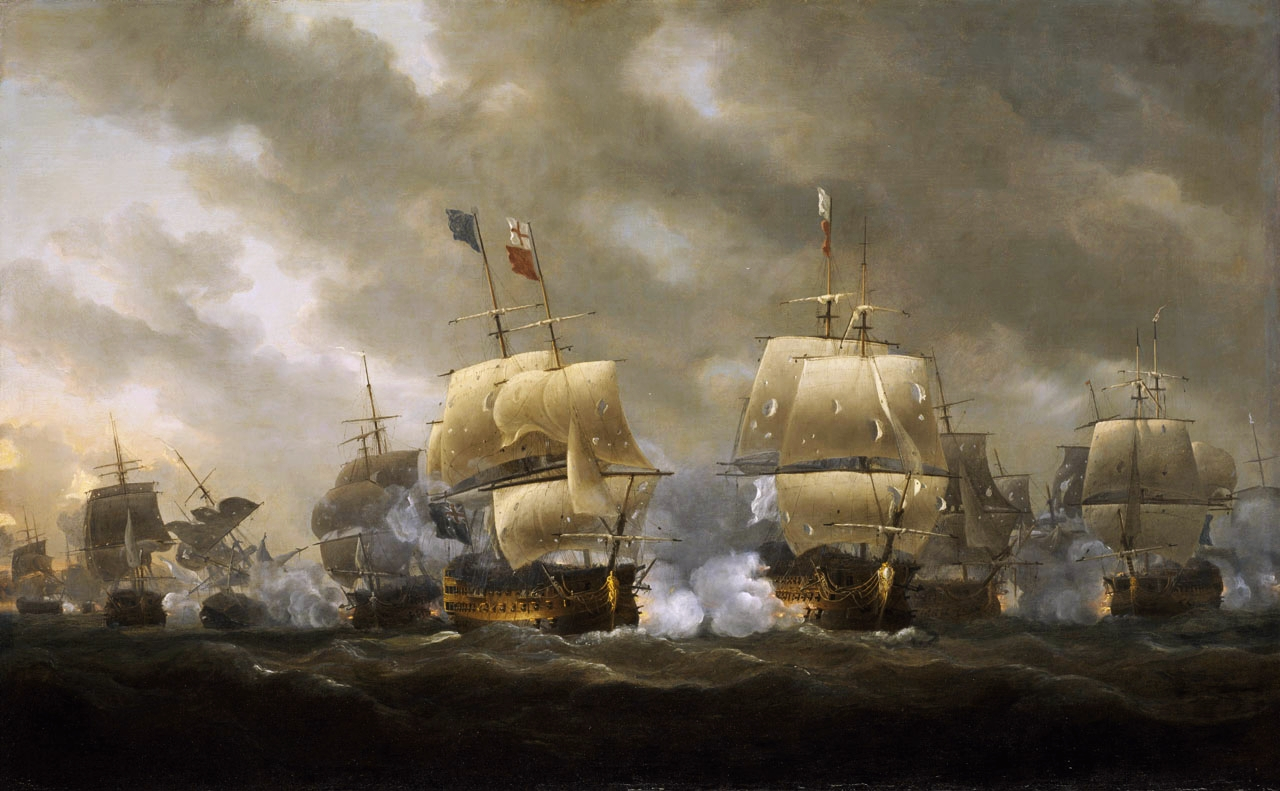
The French naval defeat at Quiberon Bay in 1759, near Saint-Nazaire in Brittany, proved a devastating setback to the planned invasion, and was one of the major reasons behind its ultimate cancellation.

By 1759, the Royal Navy had expanded to 71,000 personnel and 275 ships in commission, with another 82 under ordinance. During the war the British had instituted a new system of blockade, by which they penned in the main French fleets at anchor in Brest and Toulon. The British were able to keep an almost constant force poised outside French harbours. The French inability to counter this had led to a collapse in morale among French seamen and the wider population. The French government had devised a plan that would allow them to launch their invasion. It required a junction of the two French fleets in the English Channel, where they would be able to cover a major invasion. However, in August 1759 the French Mediterranean Fleet under Admiral Jean-François de La Clue-Sabran left harbour and was destroyed at the Battle of Lagos near Portugal. This left only the Channel Fleet at Brest under Hubert de Brienne comte de Conflans. When he tried to break free of the British blockade in November, he was run down and attacked by the British under Admiral Edward Hawke at the Battle of Quiberon Bay. This victory left the British in almost total command of the seas, compounded by the effective use of naval forces in the West Indies, Canada and India. A small French force under François Thurot did manage to land on the Irish coast, and menace Belfast before being forced to withdraw and being destroyed by a Royal Navy squadron in the Irish Sea.

=== New France ===
The year was rounded out by the news of Wolfe's victory at Quebec, resulting in the capture of the capital of New France (see below).

=== Elsewhere ===
However, while 1759 was acclaimed as Britain's 'Annus Mirabilis', for the Prussians, the year had been as disastrous as it had been successful for the British. Prussia's armies had suffered a string of defeats and suffered large numbers of casualties. At times Prussia veered close to total collapse, notably after the Battle of Kunersdorf, was now heavily dependent on continued British financial assistance and only survived due to the Miracle of the House of Brandenburg.

== Conquest of Canada (1758–1760) ==
=== Louisbourg ===
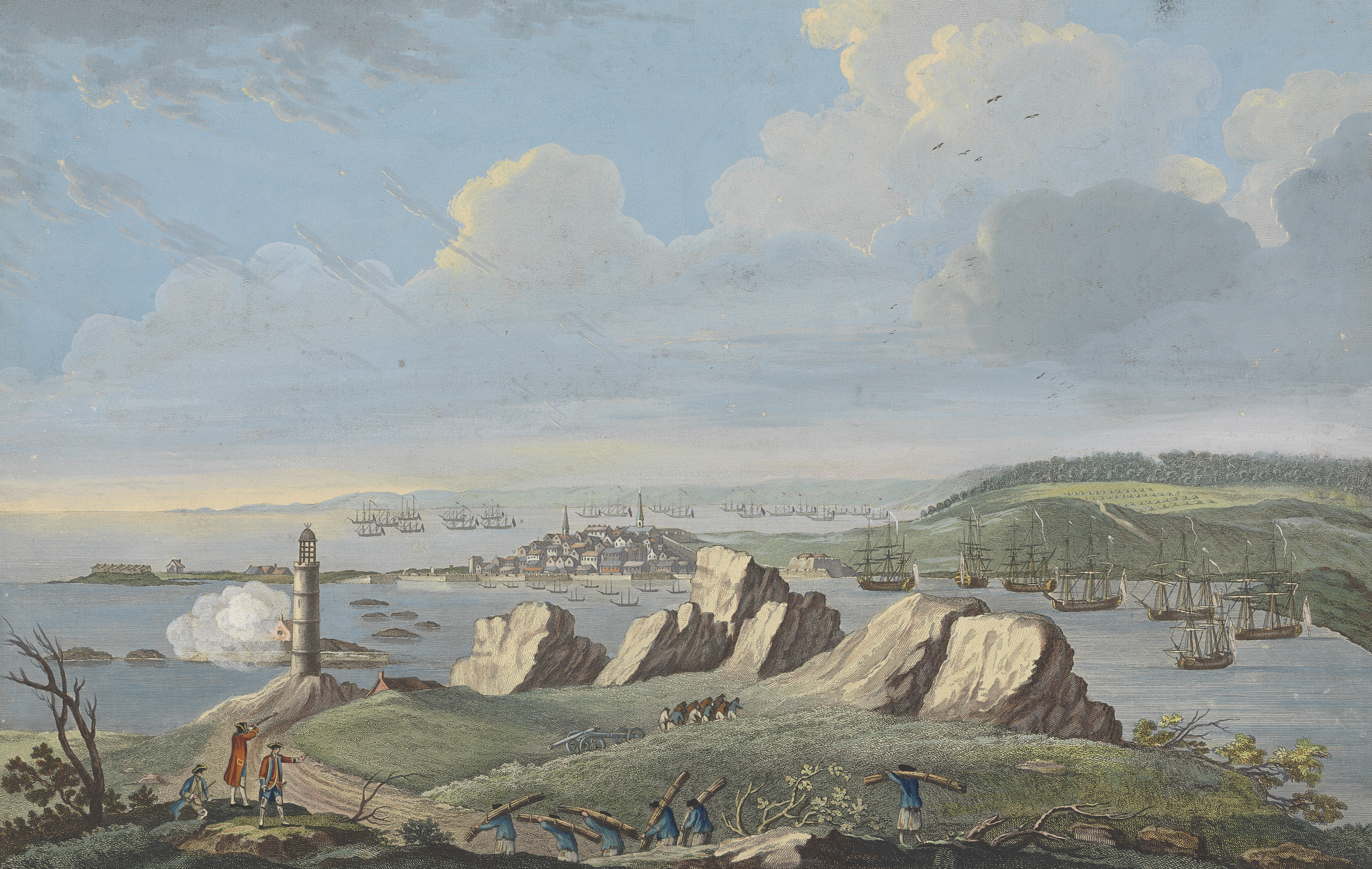
View of Louisbourg in Nova Scotia when the city was besieged by British forces in 1758

Following the failure of the British to take Louisbourg in 1757, a second attempt was planned in 1758, and command was given to General Jeffery Amherst. Although Louisbourg did not control entry to the Saint Lawrence River, it could not simply be bypassed, and the British decided it must be taken before they could proceed further. After a 44-day siege, the city finally capitulated. One of the figures who benefited most from the campaign was a young British brigadier, James Wolfe, who so impressed Pitt that he was promoted and given command of future expeditions in Canada. Despite their victory at Louisbourg, the British decided to wait for the spring before heading further up the St. Lawrence. In the meantime, the river was extensively charted by a naval officer, James Cook, later to become famous as an explorer. Dispatches carrying news of the victory sparked euphoria in Britain, and were celebrated by numerous bonfires.

=== Quebec ===
The key to British strategy in North America involved taking Quebec City—the capital and largest city of New France. This was to be achieved by the deployment of a massive force up the Saint Lawrence River. Simultaneously an Anglo-American force would march from New York to capture Fort Carillon and possibly Fort Niagara as well. While many, particularly Pitt and the American inhabitants, hoped that Canada could be annexed, others saw it as a bargaining chip to offset potential British losses in Europe. By the time the French realised the scale of the British intentions in Canada, it was too late to send assistance to Quebec. The French government hoped that Louis-Joseph de Montcalm, New France's military commander, would be able to resist for the next year, after which they would send troops to his aid.

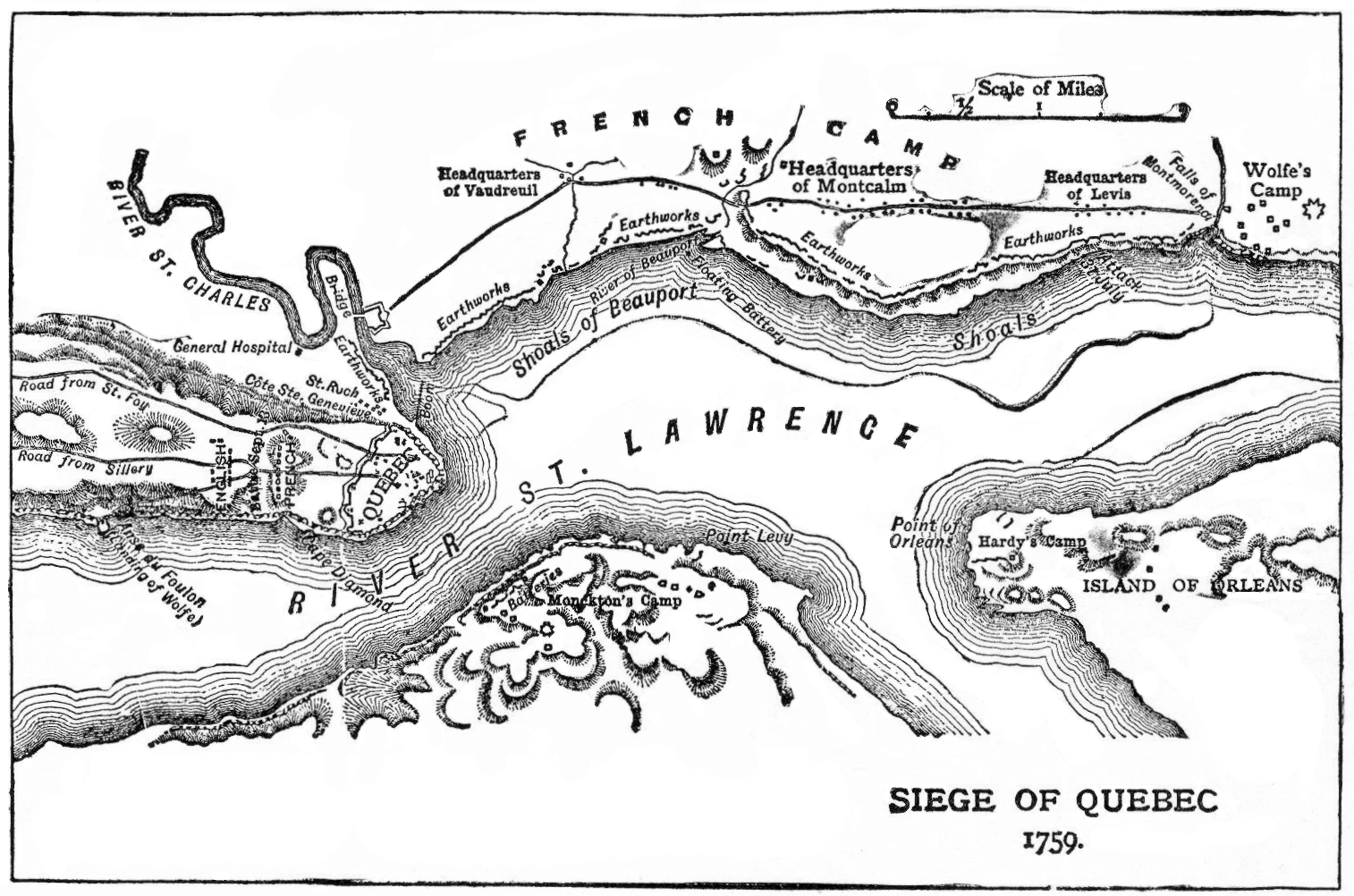
Map of the Quebec City area showing disposition of French and British forces. The Plains of Abraham (not labelled) are located at left, to the west of Quebec.

Wolfe arrived outside Quebec on 28 June. For much of the rest of the summer, he probed the defences of the city, trying to find a way through. Montcalm constantly frustrated him, shifting his own troops about in response. The cat-and-mouse game between the two generals reached a climax towards the end of the summer. If Wolfe could not capture the city, he would likely be forced to withdraw in the face of the hostile Canadian winter. An attempt to land on the Montmorency was beaten back at the Battle of Beauport, and almost proved disastrous. Wolfe now searched for another place to land and make his attack. On 12 September, the British learned of a convenient landing spot, and Wolfe moved his army there at night. The following day the Battle of the Plains of Abraham took place. It proved to be a decisive British victory, though one in which both Wolfe and Montcalm were killed. The British then took over the city.

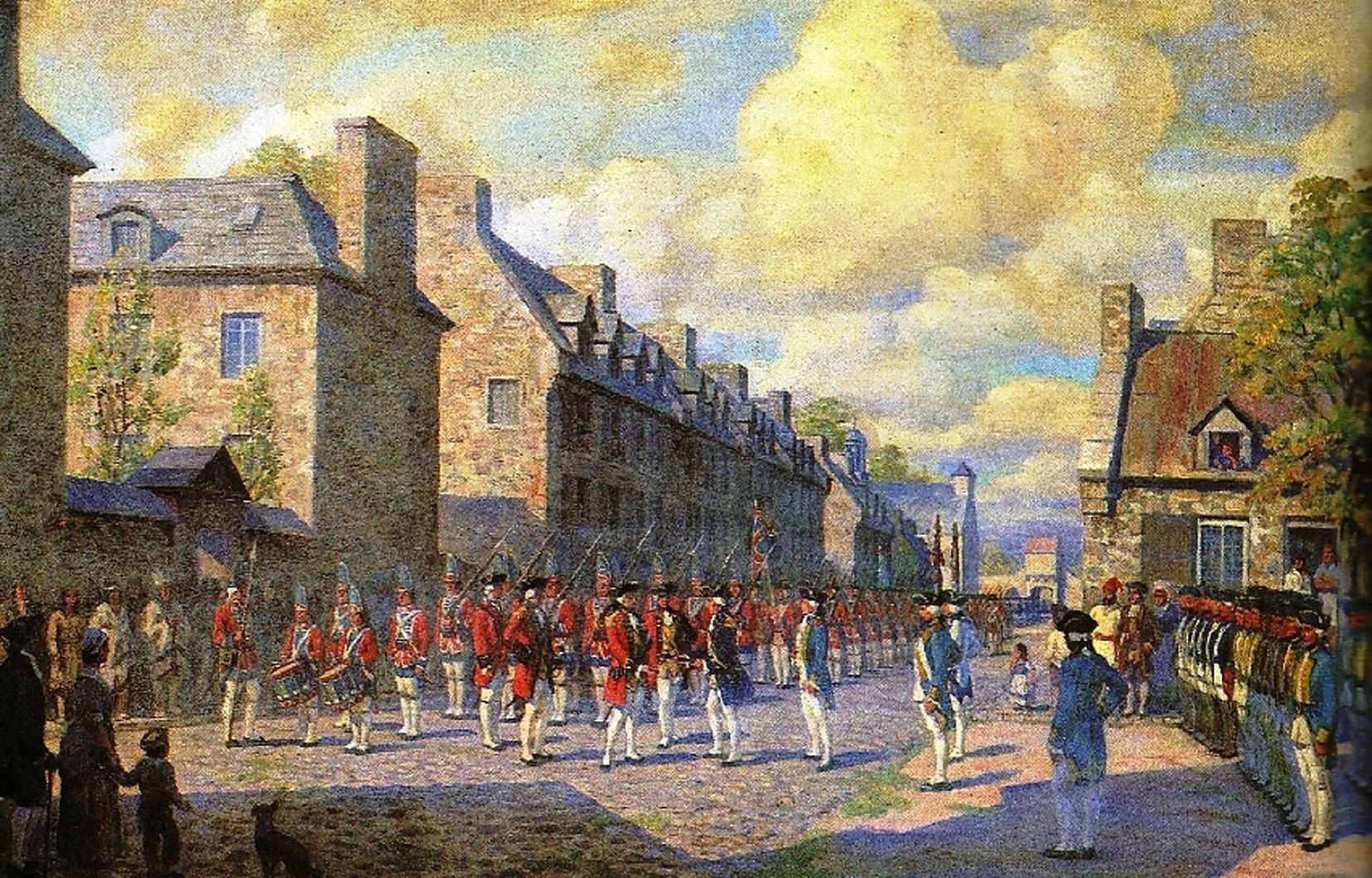
Surrender of the French Army in Montreal in 1760

The British were further cheered by the news that Amherst had taken Fort Carillon (after which it was renamed Fort Ticonderoga, as it is known today) and a second expedition had captured Fort Niagara. The French and their native allies were now under increasing pressure, compounded by guerrilla activities spearheaded by Britain's Mohawk allies and Rogers' Rangers. Despite the celebrated victory at Quebec, the campaign was not over—the French still had significant forces at large in North America swelled by refugees from the surrounding countryside. The following spring the French regrouped under François Gaston de Lévis and launched an attempt to retake Quebec. The Battle of Sainte-Foy took place on 28 April 1760 and proved even bloodier than the previous battle. Though the French prevailed, the British were able to retreat into Quebec. The subsequent siege of Quebec lasted from 29 April until 15 May when British ships arrived to relieve the city which compelled de Lévis to break off the siege and retreat.

=== Montreal ===
The arrival of British ships and reinforcements ended the French offensive and forced them to retreat in the direction of Montreal. The British pursued, capturing parts of the city on 1 September 1760 after encountering only light resistance. The last French army under de Lévis was finally forced to surrender on 6 September 1760 when a second British army under Amherst arrived from the south following the Battle of the Thousand Islands, and an attempt at French reinforcement was stopped in the naval Battle of Restigouche.

The British had responded to the French challenge in North America by striking at the heart of New France. Though it had been a long and costly series of campaigns, it proved to be one of the most successful of Pitt's policies. While a modest French presence remained in Illinois and Louisiana the fighting served to end any significant French military threats in North America for good.

== Victory in India (1760–1761) ==
Following the British victory at Madras, their forces took the offensive. A force under Francis Forde captured the port of Masulipatam. Although he still had significant forces in India, the French commander Lally had expected greater support from his own navy, but he was constantly frustrated by the cautious Anne Antoine, Comte d'Aché. Fresh British reinforcements arrived, tilting the balance in their favour. The failure of the French navy to secure command of the Indian Ocean opened their own territory to capture.

=== Pondicherry ===
Pondicherry's capture proved to be a decisive moment in the long-term battle for control in India. After this point, French India was confined to a handful of trading posts stretched along the coast, while the East India Company moved into the interior, extending its conquests to create the wide-reaching territories of British India, and by subsidiary alliances setting up the even wider British Indian Empire. By the end of 1761, the French were fearful that the British forces in India were preparing to strike at the island of Mauritius, and made no effort to reverse their losses in India.

== War in Europe (1760–1762) ==
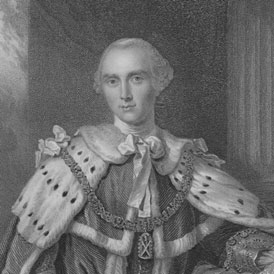
Lord Bute's rise to power between 1760 and 1762 dramatically influenced the emphasis of Britain's war effort. Like the new king, Bute favoured an end to British involvement on the continent.

1760 marked a major milestone in British strategy, caused by the death of George II. His grandson George III was much less committed to a British role in Germany which he saw as unnecessary. He also disliked Newcastle and Pitt, describing them as "knave" and a "snake in the grass", and elevated his former tutor John Stuart, 3rd Earl of Bute into a senior role in the cabinet. The dovish Bute soon clashed with Pitt over various aspects of British policy. Bute did give his assent to Pitt's plan for a British expedition to capture the island of Belle Île in 1761.

=== West German campaign ===
After his victory at Minden the Duke of Brunswick continued to lead the Anglo-German army which received increasing resources and reinforcements from Britain. Brunswick was now facing several large French armies under the overall command of Victor-François, 2nd duc de Broglie which tried to envelop the west German frontier. The French still hoped to offset their losses to the British in other parts of the globe by capturing Hanover—which could be used as a bargaining chip in any peace negotiations. The French continued to invest large numbers of troops—which were badly needed elsewhere. In 1761 Brunswick won another major victory over Broglie at the Battle of Villinghausen.

The French made a final attempt to invade Hanover in 1762 which was defeated at the Battle of Wilhelmsthal. Brunswick then went on the attack, driving the French southwards and capturing Cassel before the war was halted by an armistice.

=== End of the Prussian Alliance ===
Bute began to champion the idea that Britain should disentangle itself from the German war, and suggested to Frederick the Great that he might make peace with Austria by giving them back Silesia. Frederick rejected the proposal, although Prussian fortunes were at a low ebb by 1761 following defeats on several fronts. Debates began in London about cancelling all British subsidies to Frederick entirely. By early 1762—despite the success of Brunswick's army in Western Europe—Russian troops were poised to capture Berlin and a partition of Prussia was actively planned. Frederick was spared by the sudden death of Empress Elizabeth of Russia, who was succeeded by the pro-Prussian Peter III. He was an ardent admirer of Frederick and immediately switched Russia from an enemy of Prussia to an ally—withdrawing the threat from Berlin and sending his troops against the Austrians. This dramatically shifted the balance of power in Europe—suddenly handing Frederick the initiative. He recaptured southern Silesia and forced Austria to the negotiating table.

== War with Spain (1762) ==
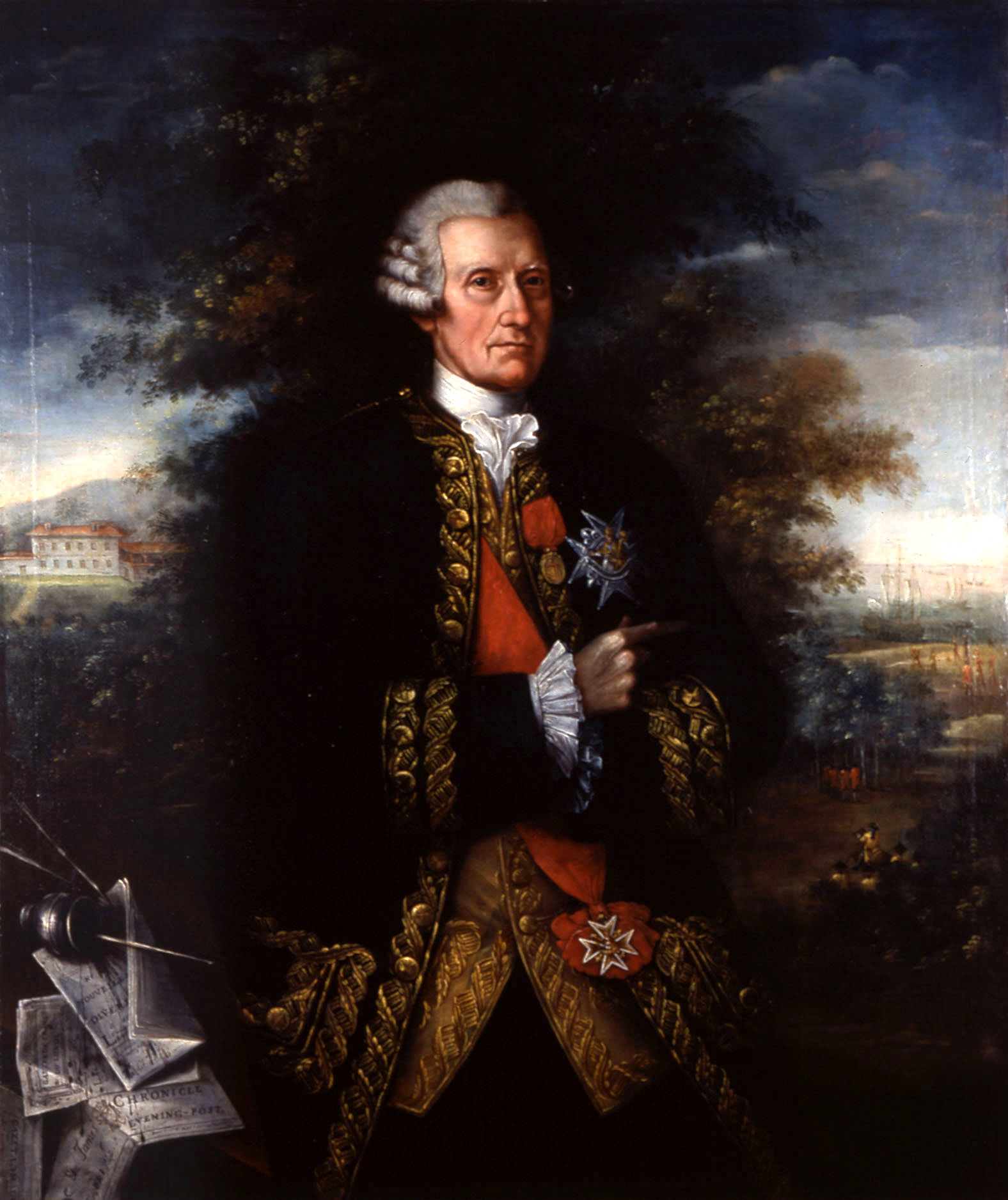
Ricardo Wall, who managed to keep Spain out of the war, but lost power when Charles III became king.

Through careful diplomacy and the influence of a pro-British Spanish prime minister Ricardo Wall, Spain had remained neutral through most of the war. However, with the accession of Charles III to the throne, Spanish foreign policy began to change. Charles was alarmed by the British conquest of the French Empire in North America, and feared his own empire would be Pitt's next target. He concluded the Bourbon Family Compact with France, offering them practical support.

With evidence of growing Franco-Spanish cooperation, Pitt suggested it was only a matter of time before Spain entered the war. The prospect of war with Spain shattered the cabinet unity which had existed up to that point. Pitt strongly advocated a pre-emptive strike which would allow them to capture the annual plate fleet, denying Spain of its vital resources of wealth which were shipped in. The rest of the cabinet refused, and Pitt resigned. In spite of this war with Spain swiftly became unavoidable, and on 4 January 1762 Britain duly declared war on Spain. Almost immediately, British ships under Admiral Charles Saunders moved to blockade Cádiz, the main port for silver from New Spain.

=== Portugal ===
The most pressing issue in the war with Spain was a threatened invasion of Portugal. Portugal, although a historic British ally, had remained neutral through most of the conflict. By early 1762 they were drawn into the war with the First Cevallos expedition and became a likely target of Spain. Portugal's long border with Spain was considered vulnerable and easy to overrun, rather than the more complex efforts that a siege of the British fortress of Gibraltar would require. Spanish forces began massing on the Portuguese border, ready to strike. Britain moved swiftly to support their Portuguese allies, shipping in supplies and officers to help coordinate the defence.

The original Spanish plan was to take Almeida and then to advance towards the Alentejo and Lisbon, but they switched their target to Porto as it would strike more directly at British commerce. Under the direction of Nicolás de Carvajal, Marquis of Sarria Spanish troops crossed from Galicia into northern Portugal capturing several towns. However, the thrust against Porto stalled in difficult terrain and due to the flooding of the River Esla. British troops began arriving that summer with 6,000 coming from Belle Île under John Campbell, 4th Earl of Loudoun and a further 2,000 from Ireland. Spain invested and captured the border fortress of Almeida. A British-Portuguese counter-attack led by John Burgoyne captured the Spanish town Valencia de Alcántara. French forces began to arrive to support the Spaniards, but like their allies they began to suffer high levels of attrition through disease and desertion. In November with problems with their lines of supply and communication the Bourbon allies withdrew and sued for peace. Despite the large numbers of forces involved, there had been no major battles.

=== Cuba ===
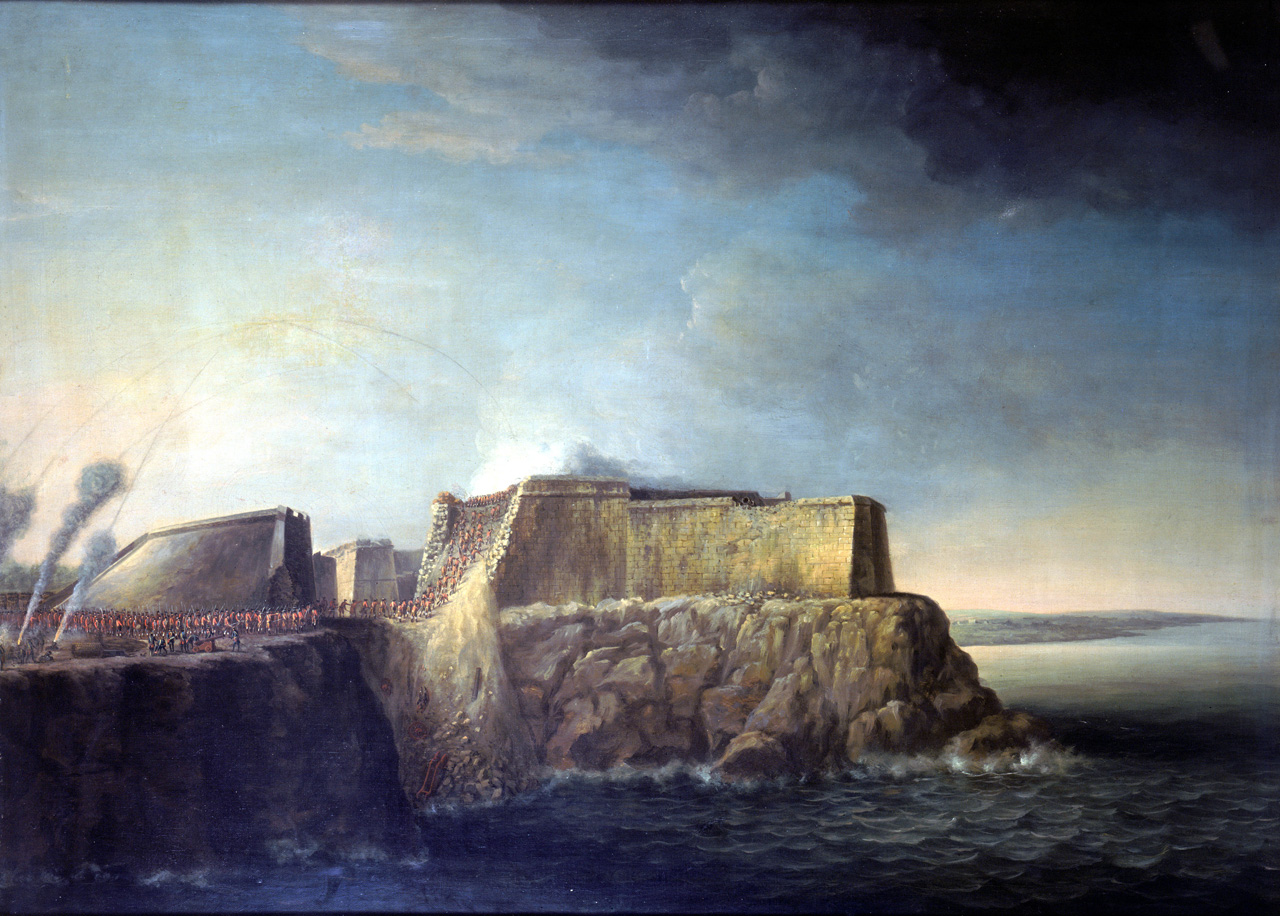
El Morro fortress in Havana, stormed by the British in July 1762

In June 1762 British forces from the West Indies landed on the island of Cuba and laid siege to Havana. Although they arrived at the height of the fever season, and previous expeditions against tropical Spanish fortresses failed due, in no small part, to tropical disease, the British government was optimistic of victory—if the troops could catch the Spanish off-guard before they had time to respond. The British commander George Keppel, 3rd Earl of Albemarle ordered a tunnel to be dug by his sappers so a mine could be planted under the walls of the city's fortress. British troops began to fall from disease at an alarming rate, but they were boosted by the arrival of 4,000 reinforcements from America. On 30 July Albemarle ordered the mine to be detonated, and his troops stormed the fortress.

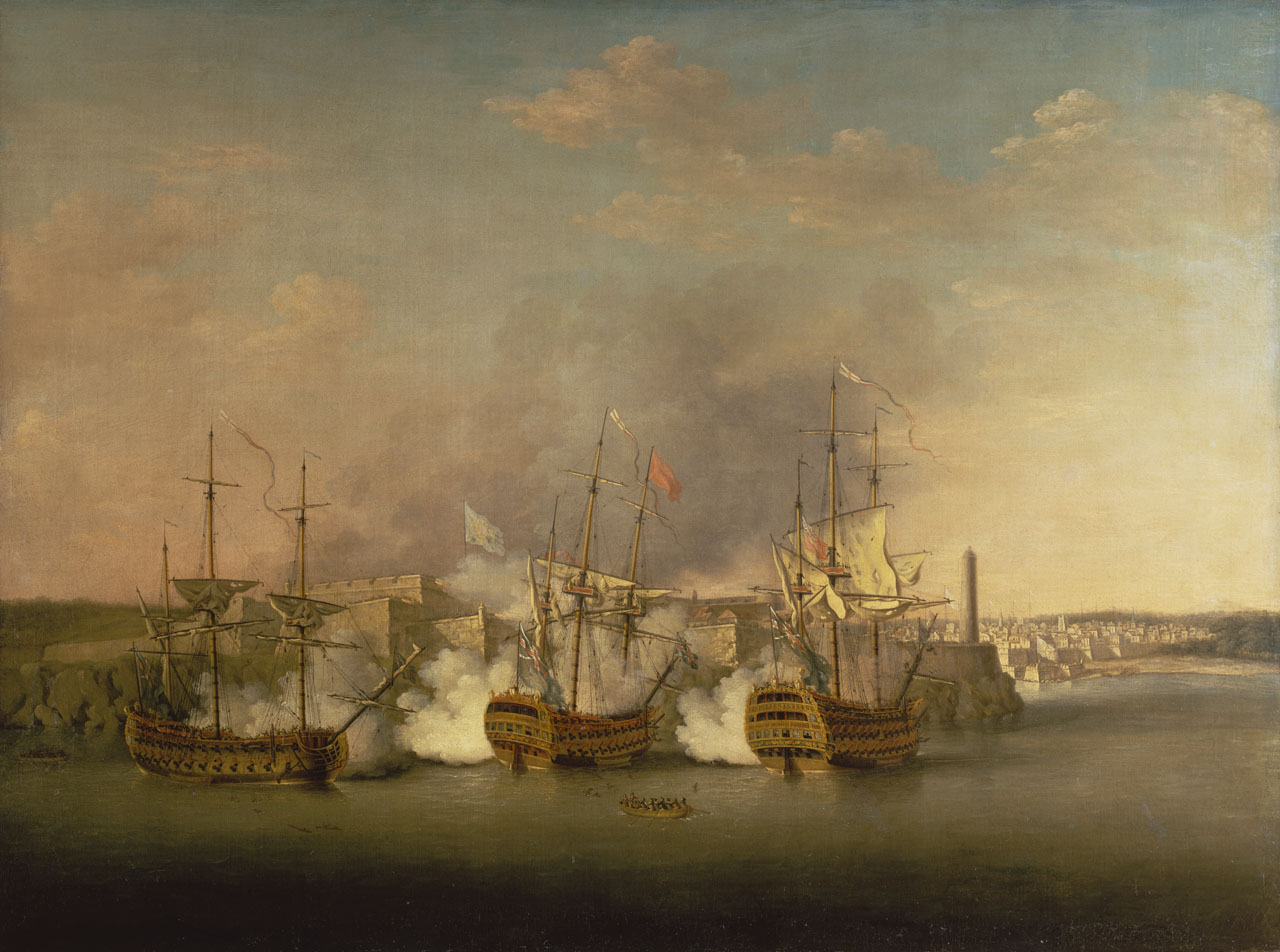
The bombardment of Havana

With Havana now in their hands, the British lay poised to strike at other targets in the Spanish Main should the war continue for another year. However, the British had suffered heavy casualties, around 1,800 deaths and more than 4,000 casualties during the siege—almost entirely from disease, and for the moment could not further advance on the rest of Cuba and set about consolidating their hold on the countryside around Havana. During the year of British occupation, commerce in Havana boomed, as the port was opened up to trade with the British Empire rather than the restricted monopoly with Cádiz that had existed before. Over the course of the occupation, Havana was used by the British as an entrepôt to supply their North American and West Indian colonies; over 10,000 Black slaves were also imported from the British West Indies to the city during the occupation, greatly boosting the Afro-Cuban population of Havana.

=== Philippines ===
Almost as soon as war had been declared with Spain, orders had been dispatched for a British force at Madras to proceed to the Philippines and invade Manila. A combined force of 10,700 men under William Draper set off from India in late July, arriving in Manila Bay in September 1762. They had to move swiftly before the monsoon season hit. On 6 October the British stormed the city, capturing it. A large amount of plunder was taken from the city after the Battle of Manila.

Spanish forces regrouped under Simón de Anda y Salazar, who had escaped from Manila during the siege. Rebellions fomented by the British were sabotaged by Spanish agents and crushed by Spanish forces. Just like in Cuba with Havana, the British were prevented from extending their authority beyond Manila and the nearby port of Cavite, making their occupation limited and tenuous, not likely to last. All agreements made between the British commander and Archbishop Manuel Rojo del Río y Vieyra were dismissed as illegal. Eventually the British forces started to suffer troop desertions and dissensions within the command.

Because news of the city's capture didn't reach Europe until after the Treaty of Paris, no provision was made regarding its status. During the siege, the Spanish lieutenant governor had agreed to a four million payment in silver dollars to the British known as the Manila Ransom in exchange for sparing the city but the full amount was never paid when word of what had happened in the Philippines reached Europe. The Spanish government demanded compensation for crimes committed against the residents of Manila during the occupation and the controversy over the ransom demanded by the British and the compensation demanded by the Spanish lasted many years. The twenty month occupation of Manila ended in 1764.

== Other campaigns ==
=== Senegal ===
One of the earliest schemes Pitt had for colonial expeditions was in West Africa where France had several lucrative but strategically unimportant bases. He was fighting against a great deal of scepticism in the British government, which saw Europe as the main venue of warfare and all other theatres as costly distractions. As an initial test of his strategy Pitt gained support for a British expedition proposed by a New York merchant Thomas Cumming to take the French trading station at Fort Louis on the Senegal River which they did with relative ease, carrying back a large amount of plunder to Britain. Subsequent expeditions also took out French posts at Gorée and on the River Gambia.

=== Martinique ===
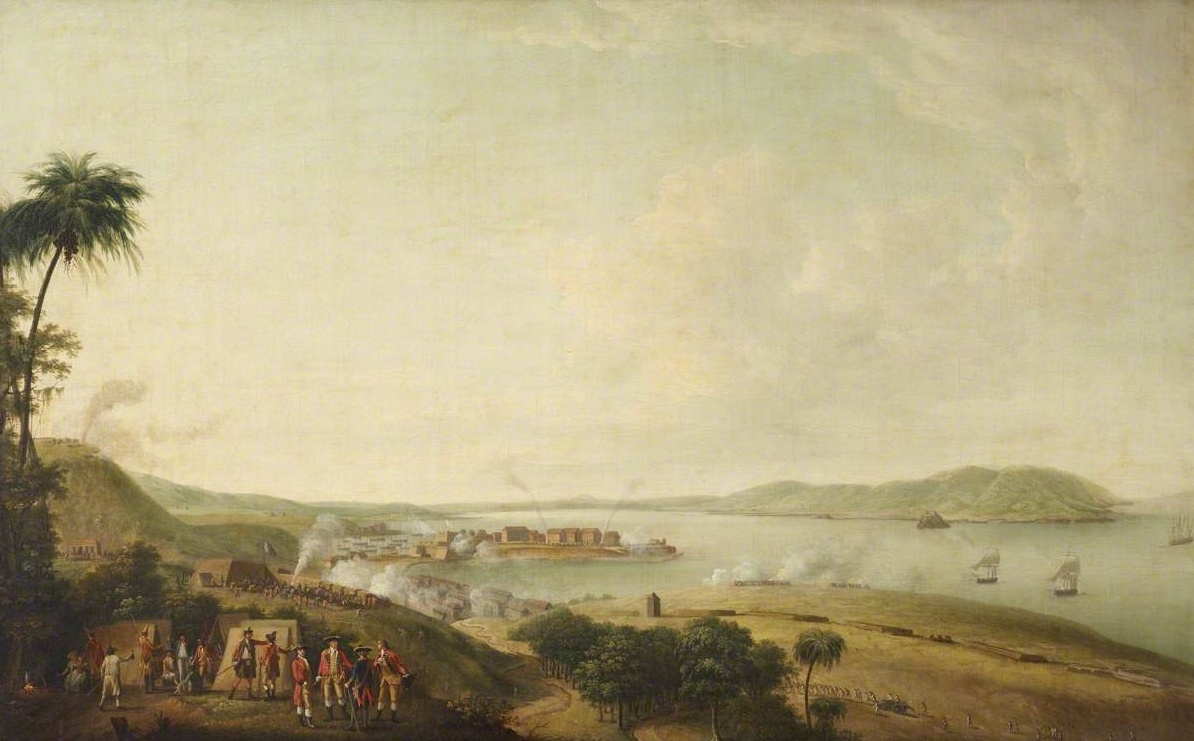
The British attack on Martinique in January 1762

Despite taking Guadeloupe in 1759, the British attempt to occupy Martinique that year had ended in failure. In 1761, a fresh scheme to attack the French West Indies was drawn up, and Martinique was successfully taken by a British force in February 1762. This was followed up by the capture of the islands of Saint Lucia, Grenada and Saint Vincent. In each case, many of the local planters and merchants welcomed the invasion, as it ended Britain's naval blockade and restored their access to international trade.

=== Newfoundland ===
In a final attempt to try to gain some advantage against the British, the French managed to slip an expedition through the British blockade and head towards Newfoundland, considered valuable because of its large fishery. The small British garrison was swiftly overwhelmed and the French believed they could use Newfoundland as a bargaining counter to extract the return of several of their own territories. General Amherst responded by dispatching a force of men from New York under his younger brother William Amherst to recapture the island. They managed to defeat a French force at the Battle of Signal Hill on 15 September 1762, forcing the total capitulation of the French expedition three days later.

== Peace treaty ==
=== Negotiations ===
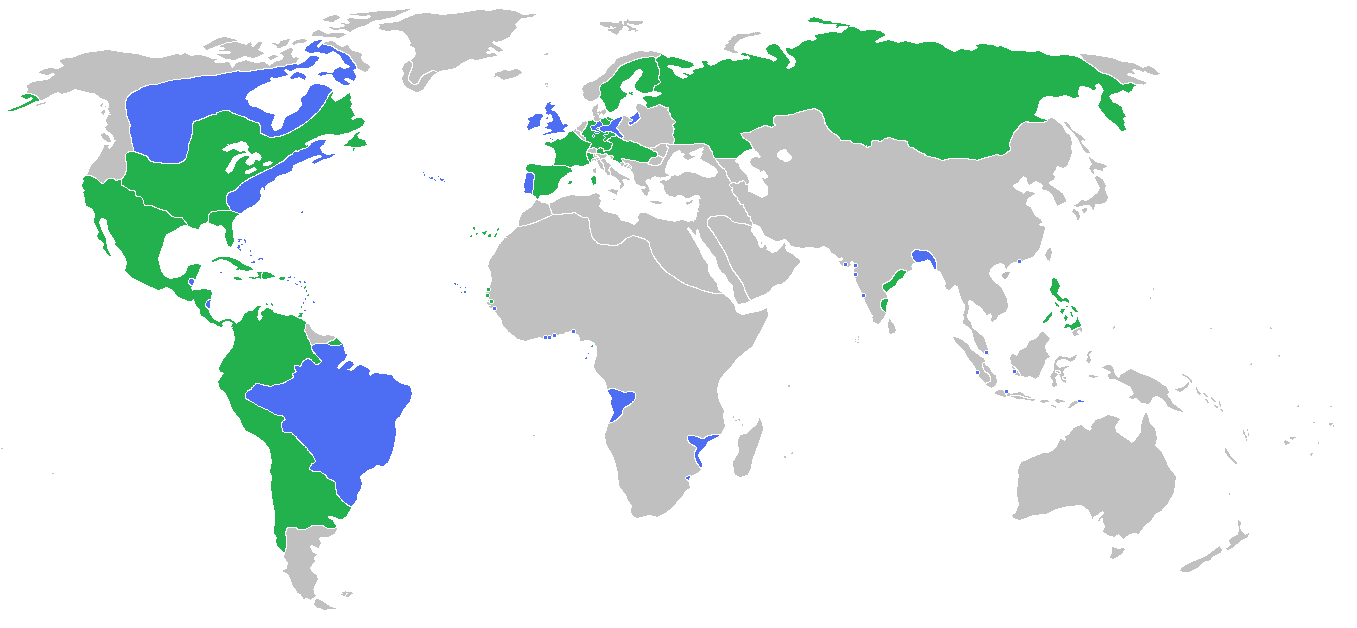
The participants of the Seven Years' War by 1762 Great Britain, Prussia, Portugal, with allies France, Spain, Austria, Russia, Sweden with allies

By 1763, the British government had an extreme shortage of money, though not as severe as that facing the French government. The collapse of the alliance with the Prussians ended that costly involvement, and by late 1762 the war around the world was winding towards a close. In Britain the new Bute ministry had taken full control of government, following the departure of Newcastle in March 1762 after a power struggle. The government agreed to an armistice and began fresh negotiations with the French in Paris directed by the Duke of Bedford.

In Britain, the negotiations that proceeded to the peace agreement proved hugely controversial. Strong opposition, led principally by Newcastle and Pitt, was raised against the terms which were perceived to be exceedingly lenient towards France and Spain. A mob went so far as to attack a carriage carrying George III in protest at the alleged betrayal. Nonetheless, Bute felt the war needed to be brought to an end, and the terms on offer were reasonable.

Britain held a dominant position at the negotiations, as they had during the last seven years seized Canada, Guadeloupe, Martinique, Dominica, Pondicherry, Senegal, and Belle Île from the French and Havana and Manila from the Spanish. Only one British territory, Menorca, was in enemy hands. Despite suffering a year of defeats, Spain was prepared to fight on—something which their French allies were opposed to. Bute proposed a suggestion that France cede her remaining North American territory of Louisiana to Spain to compensate Madrid for its losses during the war. This formula was acceptable to the Spanish government, and allowed Britain and France to negotiate with more legroom.

=== Terms of the peace agreement ===
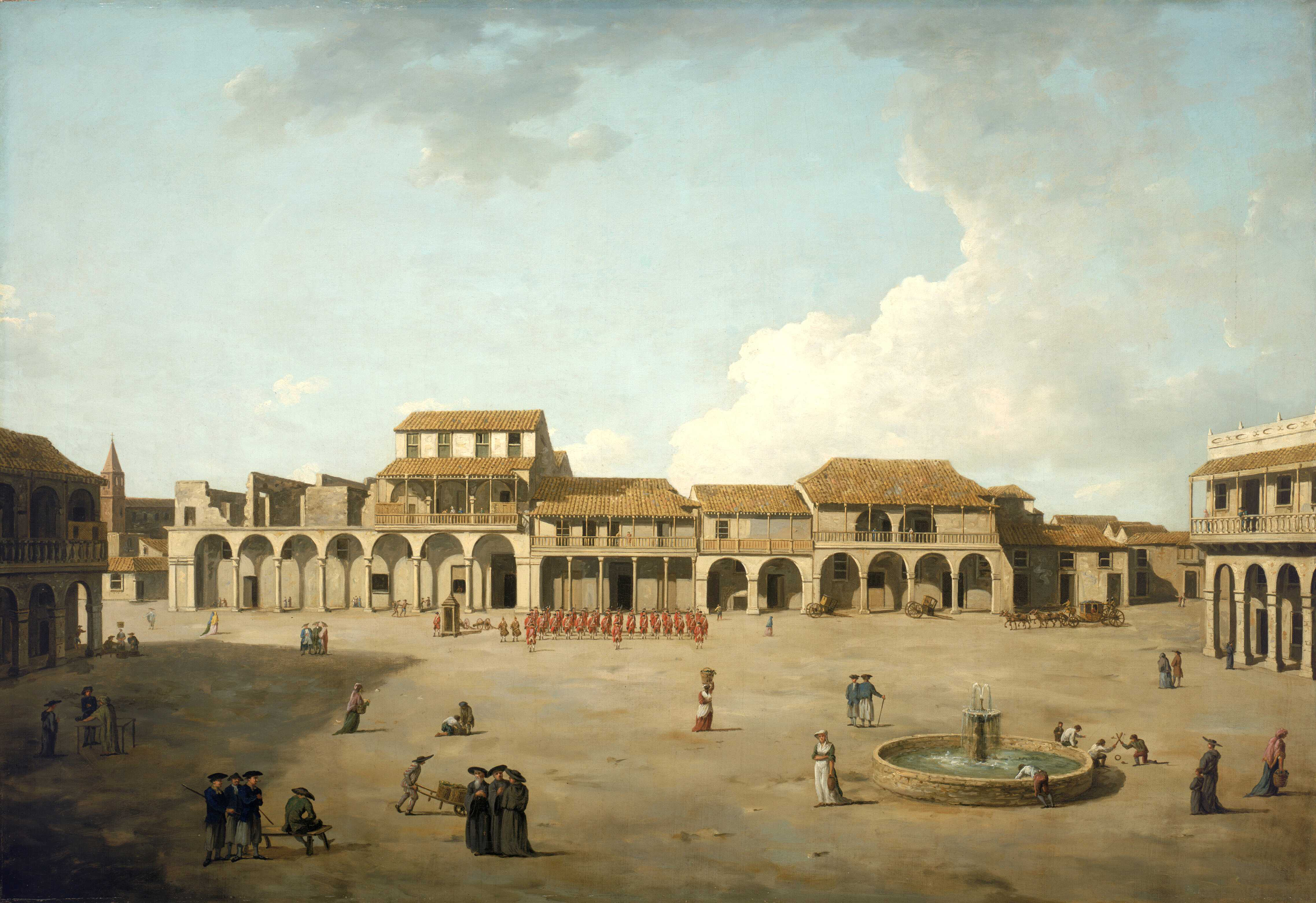
The Piazza at Havana by Dominic Serres. British troops occupied Havana until 1763 before it was returned to Spain in exchange for Florida.

Having severed their connection with the Prussians the previous year, the British negotiated a separate peace to the Prussians—dealing with their two principal adversaries France and Spain. Britain received formal control of New France, while handing back Martinique and Guadeloupe. The British were handed all of mainland North America east of the Mississippi River. The British also returned Havana and Manila to Spain in exchange for Florida.

In the wake of Britain's territorial expansion Sir George Macartney observed that Britain now controlled "a vast Empire, on which the sun never sets".

Despite France's losses, Choiseul was satisfied not to have been forced to hand over more territory in the Caribbean and was delighted that he had been able to maintain a French presence in Newfoundland (Saint Pierre and Miquelon), guaranteeing continued access to the valuable fishery there. A separate peace agreement between Austria and Prussia was concluded at the Treaty of Hubertusburg on 15 February returning Central Europe to the status quo ante bellum.

== Legacy and aftermath ==
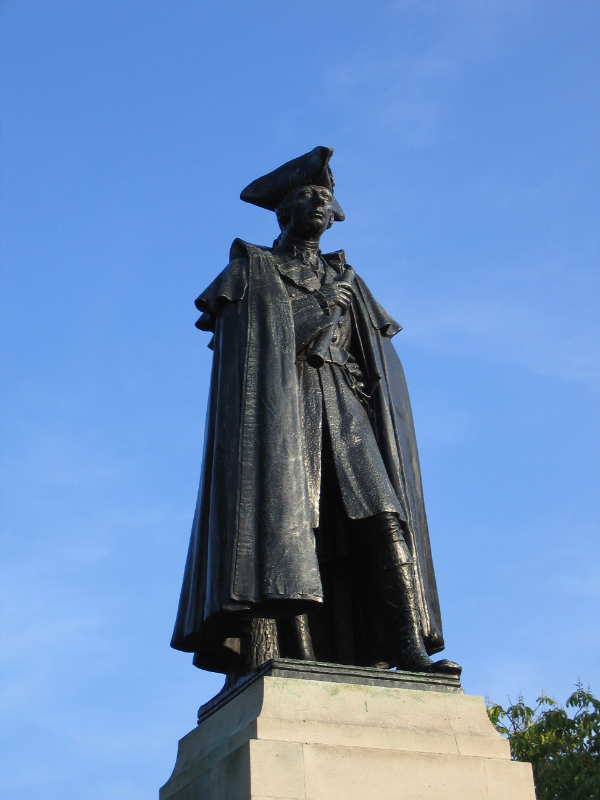
Statue of Wolfe in Greenwich Park, east London, overlooking his burial site in St Alfege Church

The number of casualties suffered by British forces were comparatively light, compared to the more than a million fatalities that occurred worldwide.

France and Spain both considered the treaty that ended the war as being closer to a temporary armistice rather than a genuine final settlement, and William Pitt described it as an "armed truce". Britain had customarily massively reduced the size of its armed forces during peace time, but during the 1760s a large military establishment was maintained—intended as a deterrent against France and Spain. The Bourbon powers both sent agents to examine Britain's defenses believing that a successful invasion of Britain was an essential part of any war of revenge.

The British victory in the war sowed some of the seeds of Britain's later conflict in the American War of Independence. American colonists had been delighted by the huge swathes of North America that had now been brought under formal British control, but many were angered by the Proclamation of 1763, which was an attempt to protect Native American territory—and prevent European settlement. Similarly the issue of quartering the British regular troops became a thorny issue, with colonists objecting to their billeting in private homes. Events such as these contributed to a drift apart between the British government and many of its subjects in the Thirteen Colonies.

The war had also brought to an end the "Old System" of alliances in Europe, In the years after the war, under the direction of John Montagu, 4th Earl of Sandwich, the British did try to re-establish this system but European states such as Austria and the Dutch Republic now saw Britain as a potentially greater threat than France and did not join them, while the Prussians were angered by what they considered a British betrayal in 1762. Consequently, when the American War of Independence turned into a global war between 1778 and 1783, Britain found itself opposed by a strong coalition of European powers, and lacking any substantial ally.

== See also ==
- France in the Seven Years' War

== Bibliography ==
- Anderson, Fred (2001). Crucible of War: The Seven Years' War and the Fate of Empire in British North America, 1754–1766. London: Faber and Faber. ISBN 9780571205653.
- Anderson, Fred; Cayton, Andrew (2005). The Dominion of War: Empire and Liberty in North America 1500–2000. New York: Penguin Books. ISBN 9780143036517.
- Anderson, Fred (2006). The War that Made America: a Short History of the French and Indian War. New York: Penguin Books. ISBN 9780143038047.
- Black, Jeremy (2008). Pitt the Elder. Cambridge: Cambridge University Press. ISBN 9780521391160.
- Browning, Reed (1975). The Duke of Newcastle. Yale: Yale University Press. ISBN 9780300017465.
- Brown, Peter Douglas (1978). William Pitt, Earl of Chatham: The Great Commoner George. London: Allen & Unwin. ISBN 9780049421455.
- Carter, Alice Clare (1971). The Dutch Republic in Europe in the Seven Years' War. London: MacMillan. OCLC 1376114791.
- Corbett, Julian Stafford (1907). England in the Seven Years' War: a study in combined strategy. Vol. 2. London: Longmans Green and Co.
- Dull, Jonathan R. (2005). The French Navy and the Seven Years' War. Lincoln: University of Nebraska. ISBN 9780803217317.
- Hibbert, Christopher (1999). George III: A Personal History. London: Penguin Books. ISBN 0140257373.
- Hough, Richard (2013). Captain James Cook: a biography. London: Hodder & Stoughton. ISBN 9781444719246.
- Keay, John (1994). The honourable company : a history of the English East India Company. New York: Macmillan. ISBN 0025611690.
- Kelch, Ray (1974). Newcastle: A Duke Without Money. London: Routledge and Kegan Paul. OCLC 917896506.
- Longmate, Norman (1993). Island Fortress: The Defence of Great Britain, 1603–1945. London: Grafton. ISBN 0586208461.
- McLynn, Frank (2004). 1759: The Year Britain Became Master of the World. New York: Atlantic Monthly Press. ISBN 0871138816.
- Middleton, Richard (1985). The Bells of Victory: The Pitt-Newcastle Ministry and the Conduct of the Seven Years' War, 1757–1762. Cambridge: Cambridge University Press. ISBN 0521265460.
- O'Toole, Fintan (2015). White Savage: William Johnson and the Invention of America. London: Faber and Faber. ISBN 9780571319411.
- Rodger, NAM (2006). Command of the Ocean: A Naval History of Britain, 1649–1815. London: Penguin Books. ISBN 0141026901.
- Rodger, NAM (1993). The Insatiable Earl: A Life of John Montagu, Fourth Earl of Sandwich. London: Harper Collins. ISBN 0002157845.
- Schieder, Theodor (2000). Frederick the Great. London: Longman. ISBN 0582017696.
- Simms, Brendan (2009). Three Victories and a Defeat: The Rise and Fall of the First British Empire. New York: Basic Books. ISBN 0140289844.
- Till, Geoffrey (2006). Development of British Naval Thinking: Essays in Memory of Bryan Ranft. Abingdon: Routledge. ISBN 978-0-714-65320-4.
- Schweizer, Karl W. (1989). England, Prussia, and the Seven Years War: Studies in Alliance Policies and Diplomacy. Lewiston, NY: Edwin Mellen Press. ISBN 978-0-88946-465-0.
- Black, Jeremy (1999). Britain As A Military Power, 1688–1815. London: UCL Press. ISBN 978-1-85728-772-1.
- Vego, Milan N. (2003). Naval Strategy and Operations in Narrow Seas. London: Frank Cass. ISBN 978-0-7146-5389-1.
- Wilson, Ben (2014). Empire of the deep : the rise and fall of the British Navy. London: Phoenix. ISBN 9780753829202.
