= Francis Forde (East India Company officer) =

Anglo-Irish army officer (1718–1770)

- Born: c. 1718; Seaforde, Ireland
- Disappeared: 27 December 1769 (aged c. 51); Cape Town, Cape Colony, The Netherlands
- Cause of death: Drowning (presumed)
- Allegiance: Great Britain
- Service years: 1746–1759
- Conflicts: Seven Years' War; Battle of Plassey; Battle of Condore; Siege of Masulipatam; Battle of Chinsurah
- Children: 1 son

Francis Forde (c. 1718 – disappeared 27 December 1769) was an Anglo-Irish army officer. Born in Seaforde, County Down, he was the seventh son of Irish parliamentarian Mathew Forde. He entered Trinity College Dublin in 1734 and left with a B.A. in 1738. Pursuing a military career, he was commissioned into the British Army's 39th Regiment of Foot before serving with the Bengal Army in India under Robert Clive during the Carnatic Wars.

== Early Indian service ==
He first arrived in India in the mid-1740s during the War of the Austrian Succession. By 1746, he was a Captain in the 39th Regiment of Foot. In 1755, at the request of Clive he resigned his commission in the British Army to serve in Bengal Army of the East India Company. He was soon the British second in command in Bengal following the Battle of Calcutta. He served with Clive in the subsequent Battle of Plassey. On the first anniversary, he threw a major party in honour of the victory.

== Masulipatam ==
Forde was then given a detachment of troops and ordered to drive the French from Masulipatam. He was badly supported by a local ally Anandraz but still managed to rout the French force at the Battle of Condore and overrun their camp, before laying siege to Masulipatem itself. His forces then stormed the town on 25 January 1759 losing a third of their number. He was widely commended for his leadership during the campaign.

== Chinsurah ==
Later that year he returned to Bengal and won the Battle of Chinsurah removing the Dutch threat to British power in Bengal.

== Later life ==
Despite these twin victories, Forde's brevet promotion to lieutenant colonel was not initially ratified by the East India Company. It was only with the personal intervention of Clive that he was eventually given a formal promotion. He then returned to Ireland for several years, where he lived in Johnstown in County Meath.

In 1769, he was sent out as part of a three-man committee, with Henry Vansittart and Luke Scrafton, to investigate the East India Company's practices. They set sail in the frigate Aurora in September 1769. The vessel left the Cape of Good Hope on 27 December 1769, but the ship disappeared en route to India and he was believed drowned with the rest of the passengers and crew. The captain had decided to navigate the Mozambique Channel despite bad weather.

Colonel Forde married Margaret, daughter of Thomas Bowerbank. His son Robert Forde succeeded to the property at Johnstown in County Meath and later became MP for the county.

== See also ==
- Great Britain in the Seven Years War
- List of people who disappeared mysteriously at sea

== Bibliography ==
- Harvey, Robert. Clive: The Life and Death of a British Emperor. Sceptre, 1999.
- Henty, George Alfred. With Clive in India. Or, The Beginnings of an Empire.
- Keay, John. The Honourable Company: A History of the English East India Company. Harper Collins, 1993
