= Konduru, G. Konduru mandal =

Konduru
- Village
- Interactive map of Konduru
- Location in Andhra Pradesh, India Konduru (India)
- Coordinates: 16.6788°N 80.5727°E
- Country: India
- State: Andhra Pradesh
- District: NTR
- Mandal: G. Konduru

Government
  - Type: Gram Panchayat
  - Sarpanch: Aruna Mandala

Area
  - Total: 8.63 km^{2} (3.33 sq mi)

Population (2011)
  - Total: 8,158
  - Density: 945/km^{2} (2,450/sq mi)

Languages
  - Official: Telugu
- Time zone: UTC+5:30 (IST)

Konduru is a village located in the G. Konduru mandal, NTR district of the Indian state of Andhra Pradesh. It is under the administration of Vijayawada revenue division.

== Demographics ==
According to the 2011 Census the population of Konduru is 8,158, with 4,110 males and 4,048 females, resulting in an Average Sex Ratio of 985. Konduru has a literacy rate of 70.8%.
