= Siege of Masulipatam =

1759 siege

Coordinates: 16.1844°N 81.1349°E

- Part of Seven Years' War
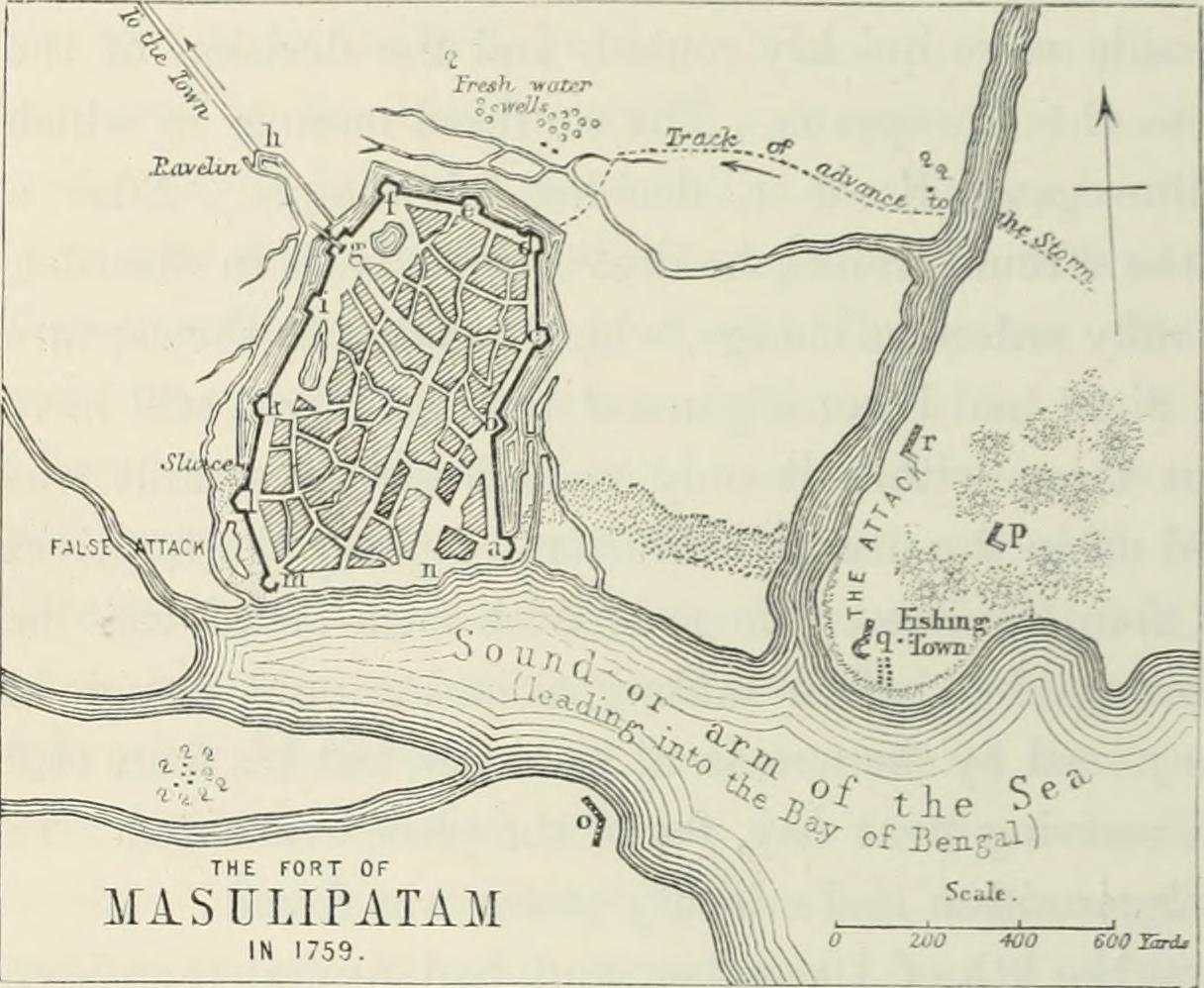
- Musalipatam fort in 1759
Date	6 March to 7 April 1759
Location	Machilipatnam, India
Result	British victory

Belligerents
British East India Company	French East India Company

Commanders and leaders
Francis Forde	Comte de Conflans

The siege of Masulipatam was a British siege of the town of Masulipatam, held by the French and Dutch, in India during the Seven Years' War. The siege commenced on 6 March 1759 and lasted until the storming of the town by the British on 7 April. The British were commanded by Colonel Francis Forde while the French defenders were under the command of Conflans.

The British taking of the town helped relieve the Siege of Madras.

== See also ==
- Great Britain in the Seven Years' War

== Bibliography ==
- Harvey, Robert. Clive: The Life and Death of a British Emperor. Sceptre, 1999.
- Henty, George Alfred. With Clive in India. Or, The Beginnings of an Empire.
- Keay, John. The Honourable Company: A History of the English East India Company. Harper Collins, 1993
- McLynn, Frank. 1759: The Year Britain Became Master of the World. Pimlico, 2005.
