= Triple Alliance (1788) =

1788 alliance between Great Britain, Prussia and Dutch Republic

The Triple Alliance of 1788 was a military alliance between Great Britain, Prussia and the Dutch Republic. Great Britain saw it as necessary to maintain the balance of power, and Prussia was hoping for the territorial gains. The alliance was primarily aimed at the Russian Empire, which stood to increase its influence with its looming victory over the Ottoman Empire. Due to efforts of Russian diplomacy (Ochakov Affair), particularly in fostering parliamentary dissent in Great Britain, where the main proponent of action against Russia, William Pitt the Younger, lost support, the Alliance fell apart before it was ready to engage in planned military action against Russia. The destruction of the Triple Alliance is considered a major success of the Russian diplomacy.

== Formation ==
In April 1788 Prussia secured a credit in case of a war with Russia from the Dutch Republic. In return, Prussia provided military backing for the unstable Dutch government. On 13 August 1788, the Anglo-Prussian military alliance was signed. This marked the formation of the Triple Alliance.

From the British perspective, the Alliance was formed to maintain the balance of power in Europe, particularly with regards to France and Russia, and the potentially unstable regions of the Baltics, the Balkans and the Netherlands. Prussia, on the other hand, was hoping for some territorial gains in the Baltic region, through war (with Russia) or diplomacy (from the Polish–Lithuanian Commonwealth), or a combination of the above. With regards to the Balkans, the Triple Alliance aimed at restraining the Russian Empire, as well as the Austrian Empire, then in alliance (Austro-Russian alliance), and there were expectations of a war between the Alliance and Russia (and possibly Austria) around 1791.

== Evolution ==
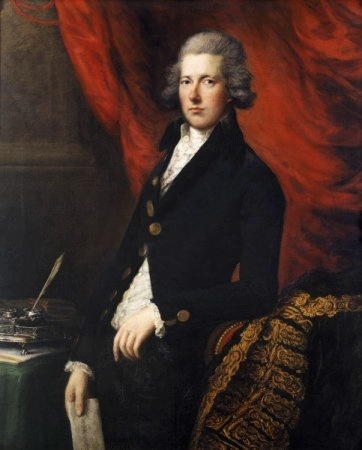
William Pitt the Younger

Great Britain did not want war, in so much as it would be content if Russia would retreat from its war with the Ottomans without any territorial changes, but it realized this was an unlikely outcome. Starting in August 1790, British and Prussian diplomats in Russia started pressuring the Russians to begin negotiations with the Ottomans, with no luck.

Realizing that William Pitt the Younger was seriously considering hardline politics towards Russia, and that a war with Prussia and Great Britain would likely end up with a loss, Russian Empress Catherine the Great ordered her ambassador in London, Semyon Vorontsov, to aid Pitt's opponent, Charles Fox, in the British Parliament. Vorontsov and other members of the Russian diplomatic staff had arranged, on occasion through bribery, for support from many members of the British establishment.

The Dutch Republic was much less interested in a war with Russia, as Russia had significant debts to Dutch bankers, which the war could jeopardize. William Eden, 1st Baron Auckland, British ambassador to the Dutch Republic, was on good terms with local Russian diplomatic staff, and tended to argue against any action that would involve hostilities with Russia.

Britain also failed at improving its relations with the Polish–Lithuanian Commonwealth, which at that point considered itself on good terms with Russia and did not want to jeopardize those relations by getting closer to the Triple Alliance. The end of the Russo-Swedish War (1788–1790) also meant one less potential ally for the Triple Coalition, as the king of Sweden was not willing to reopen the Russian front.

By early 1791, around February, Prussian diplomacy managed to secure an agreement with Austria. Although Austria refused to switch sides, it also agreed to remain neutral in case of a war between Russia and Prussia. This convinced Pitt to assure Frederick that Britain would send a fleet to the Baltic, and to craft an ultimatum to Russia, requiring it to retreat from its war with the Ottomans or face an Anglo-Prussian intervention; by late March this position got royal approval and the debate in British parliament was to take place soon. In the meantime, in early March, Frederick Wilhelm II assured an Ottoman representative of his desire to attack Russia as soon as the Royal Navy appeared in the Baltic Sea, and encouraged him, in a handwritten letter, to continue the ongoing war with Russia and undertake a new offensive in the Balkans. Prussia's military preparations were very advanced, with about 90,000 troops massing on the border, and plans for three corps to advance on Riga. Russia itself was gearing itself to defend the Baltic sea border against the expected invasion.

Aware of the significance of the debate to take place in the British parliament in late March, Russian diplomats in London pulled out all stops to mobilize allies to oppose an Anglo-Russian conflict. Russian diplomats spent significant funds on diplomacy and propaganda. It had assured the support of about twenty British newspapers, and begun printing and distribution of many leaflets arguing against the "Russian armament" proposal of Pitt the Younger, as the issue became known in contemporary British discourse. Russian supporters included merchants with influence at the London Stock Exchange, writers and publicists such as John Paradise ("Doctor Johnson"), as well as members of the British Parliament, such as the son of Thomas Dimsdale, Charles Fox, Edmund Burke and others.

In the days before the British debate, the Dutch had offered to negotiate between Russia and the Triple Alliance, and Auckland reported that he saw documents in which Frederick Wilhelm questioned the need for the war and expressed concerns over the militant Austrian attitude (according to Polish historian Jerzy Łojek, that was either Auckland's own or Russian misinformation, or a combination of both). The debate begun on March 29. Despite criticism from the minority opponents, like Charles Fox, the House of Commons expressed its approval for the war with Russia thrice on that day. However, over the next two or three days, debates within Pitt's own government resulted in a drastic change of plans. The specific reasons for this sudden conflict within Pitt's government are not fully understood; Łojek suggests it was through the influence of Fox, Auckland and the Russian diplomacy on several of its members. Pitt could have forced the issue by creating a new government, but he decided that was not a viable solution, as a crisis in the government could result in an unpredictable shift of power. By mid- and late April, with William Grenville, 1st Baron Grenville replacing Francis Osborne, 5th Duke of Leeds as the Foreign Secretary, the British policy was now set as pro-Russian, and anti-French.

A British courier with an ultimatum and a joint British-Prussian declaration to Russia arrived in Berlin on the night of April 3 to 4, but before he left, was intercepted on April 8 by another courier ordering a delay. It was only in early June that Prussia realized that British politics had taken a significant shift, and Britain no longer desired a war with Russia. This meant the end of the Triple Alliance.

== Aftermath ==
The end of the alliance was cemented by the British-Netherlands-Prussian-Russian treaty of 26 July 1791, in which the Triple Alliance de facto capitulated to all Russian demands, accepting all Russian territorial demands on Ottomans. Within two years all the signatories of the alliance were at war with France following the outbreak of the French Revolutionary War.

Łojek notes that historiography of the fall of the Triple Alliance is sparse, as it was overshadowed by the interest in issues related to the French Revolution; as he notes, a war that never started is much less interesting than the revolution that changed the world. He notes that the end of the alliance was a triumph of the Russian diplomacy, and failure of the British one, as well as a personal failure of Pitt, who since this defeat removed himself from the British foreign policy. From the Polish perspective, he notes that the failure of the Polish diplomacy to pursue an alliance with the Triple Alliance was another major factor which resulted in its weakening, and by correspondingly strengthening Russia, this Polish inactivity contributed to the fall of Poland. He notes that although some Poles, like Antoni Augustyn Deboli, argued for an alliance with Great Britain, king Stanisław August Poniatowski, who controlled most of Polish diplomacy, refused to stand in opposition to Russia, which in hindsight was a major blow for Poland.

== See also ==
- Anglo-Prussian alliance (1756)
- Polish-Prussian alliance
- Russo-Turkish War (1787–1792)
