= Gustav III =

King of Sweden from 1771 to 1792

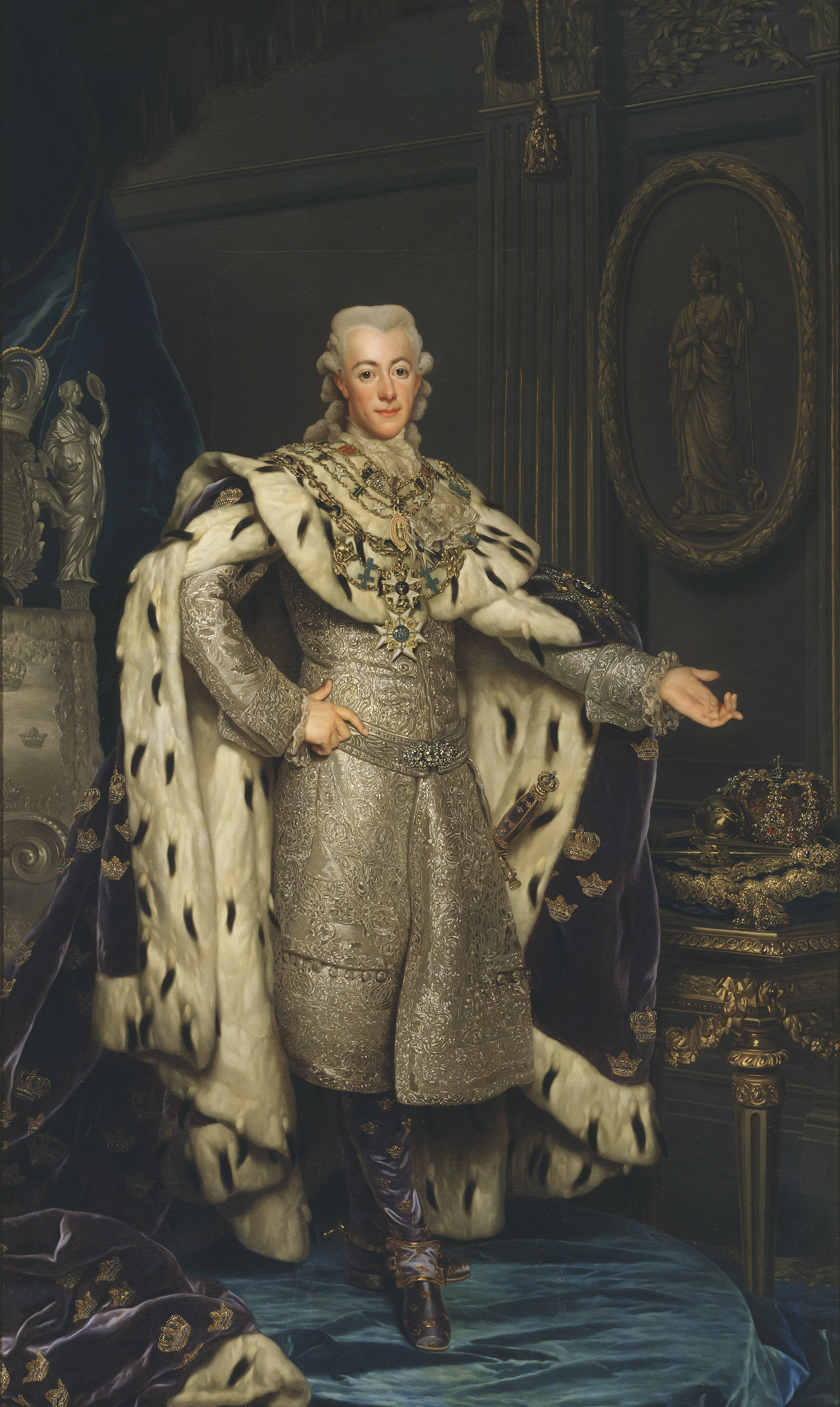
- Portrait by Alexander Roslin, 1777

King of Sweden
- Reign: 12 February 1771 – 29 March 1792
- Coronation: 29 May 1772
- Predecessor: Adolf Frederick
- Successor: Gustav IV Adolf
- Born: 24 January 1746; Stockholm, Sweden
- Died: 29 March 1792 (aged 46); Stockholm Palace, Stockholm, Sweden
- Cause of death: Assassination
- Burial: 14 May 1792; Riddarholm Church
- Spouse: Sophia Magdalena of Denmark (m. 1766)
- Issue: Gustav IV Adolf; Prince Carl Gustav, Duke of Småland
- House: Holstein-Gottorp
- Father: Adolf Frederick of Sweden
- Mother: Louisa Ulrika of Prussia
- Religion: Lutheranism

Gustav III (24 January [O.S. 13 January] 1746 – 29 March 1792), (Note: Sweden changed from the Julian calendar to the Gregorian calendar in 1753, when 17 February was followed by 1 March) also called Gustavus III, was King of Sweden from 1771 until his assassination in 1792. He was the eldest son of King Adolf Frederick and Queen Louisa Ulrika of Sweden.

Gustav was a vocal opponent of what he saw as the abuse of political privileges seized by the nobility since the death of King Charles XII in the Great Northern War. Seizing power from the government in a coup d'état, called the Swedish Revolution, in 1772 that ended the Age of Liberty, he initiated a campaign to restore a measure of royal autocracy. This was completed by the Union and Security Act of 1789, which swept away most of the powers exercised by the Swedish Riksdag of the Estates during the Age of Liberty, but at the same time, it opened up the government for all citizens, thereby breaking the privileges of the nobility.

A believer in enlightened absolutism, Gustav spent considerable public funds on cultural ventures, which were controversial among his critics, as well as military attempts to seize Norway with Russian aid, then a series of attempts to re-capture the Swedish Baltic dominions lost during the Great Northern War through the failed war with Russia. Nonetheless, his successful leadership in the Battle of Svensksund averted a complete military defeat and signified that Swedish military might was to be countenanced after its major defeats earlier in the century.

An admirer of Voltaire, Gustav legalised Catholic and Jewish presence in Sweden, and enacted wide-ranging reforms aimed at economic liberalism, social reform and the restriction, in many cases, of torture and capital punishment. The much-praised Freedom of the Press Act of 1766 was severely curtailed, however, by amendments in 1774 and 1792, effectively extinguishing independent media. Following the uprising against the French monarchy in 1789, Gustav pursued an alliance of princes aimed at crushing the insurrection and re-instating his French counterpart, King Louis XVI, offering Swedish military assistance as well as his leadership.

In 1792, he was mortally wounded by a gunshot in the lower back during a masquerade ball as part of an aristocratic-parliamentary coup attempt, but managed to assume command and quell the uprising before succumbing to sepsis 13 days later, a period during which he received apologies from many of his political enemies. Gustav's immense powers were placed in the hands of a regency under his brother Prince Carl and Gustaf Adolf Reuterholm until his son and successor Gustav IV Adolf reached adulthood in 1796. The Gustavian autocracy thus survived until 1809, when his son was ousted in another coup d'état, which definitively established parliament as the dominant political power; this has lasted until the modern day, where the Riksdag is Sweden's supreme legislature.

A patron of the arts and benefactor of arts and literature, Gustav founded the Swedish Academy, created a national costume and had the Royal Swedish Opera and Royal Dramatic Theatre built. In 1772, he founded the Royal Order of Vasa to acknowledge and reward those Swedes who had contributed to advances in the fields of agriculture, mining and commerce. He was also a patron of many cultural figures, including Alexander Roslin and Carl Michael Bellman, and is often considered one of the most important figures in the history of Swedish art, music and architecture. Gustav III was well liked by the Swedish population and was mourned upon his death.

In 1777, Gustav III was the first formally neutral head of state in the world to recognise the United States during its war for independence from Great Britain. Swedish military forces were engaged by the thousands on the side of the colonists, largely through the French expedition force. Through the acquisition of Saint Barthélemy in 1784, Gustav enabled the restoration, if symbolic, of Swedish overseas colonies in America, as well as great personal profits from the transatlantic slave trade.

== Royal title ==
Gustav III was known in Sweden and abroad by his royal titles, or styles:

Gustav, by the Grace of God, King of the Swedes, the Goths and the Vends, Grand Prince of Finland, Duke of Pomerania, Prince of Rügen and Lord of Wismar, Heir to Norway and Duke of Schleswig-Holstein, Stormarn and Dithmarschen, Count of Oldenburg and Delmenhorst, etc.

== Early life and education ==
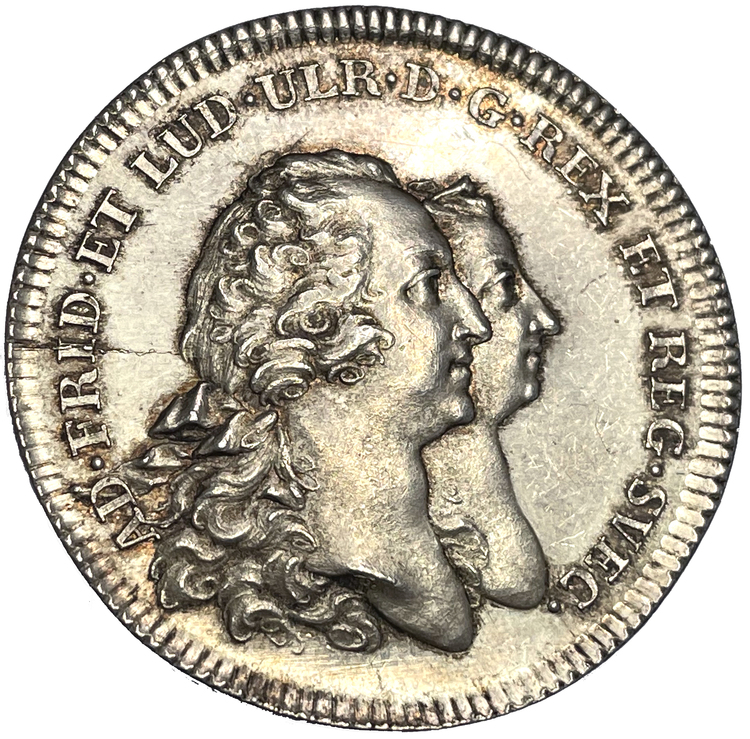
Gustav's parents, King Adolf Fredrik and Queen Louise Ulrica

Gustaf was born in Stockholm. He was placed under the tutelage of Hedvig Elisabet Strömfelt until the age of five, then educated under the care of two governors who were among the most eminent Swedish statesmen of the day: Carl Gustaf Tessin and Carl Fredrik Scheffer. Nonetheless, he perhaps owed most of what shaped him during his early education to the poet and historian Olof von Dalin.

State interference with his education as a young child caused significant political disruptions within the royal family. Gustaf's parents taught him to despise the governors imposed upon him by the Riksdag, and the atmosphere of intrigue and duplicity in which he grew up made him precociously experienced in the art of dissimulation. Even his most hostile teachers were amazed by his combination of natural gifts.

== Marriage and sons ==
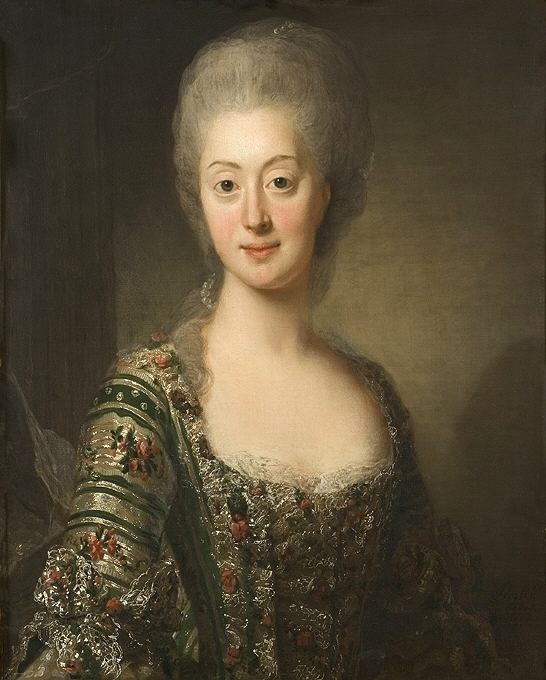
Portrait of Sophia Magdalena of Denmark, painted by Alexander Roslin in 1775

Gustav married Princess Sophia Magdalena, daughter of King Frederick V of Denmark, by proxy in Christiansborg Palace, Copenhagen, on 1 October 1766 and in person in Stockholm on 4 November 1766. Gustav was first impressed by Sophia Magdalena's beauty, but her silent nature made her a disappointment in court life. The match was not a happy one, owing partly to an incompatibility of temperament, but still more to the interference of Gustav's jealous mother, Queen Louisa Ulrika.

The marriage produced two children: Crown Prince Gustav Adolf (1778–1837), and Prince Carl Gustav, Duke of Småland (1782–1783). For the consummation of the marriage, the king and queen requested actual physical instruction by Count Adolf Munck, reportedly because of anatomical problems of both spouses. There were also rumors that the queen was made pregnant by Munck, who would then be the true father of the heir Prince Gustav Adolf. Gustav's mother supported rumors that he was not the father of his first son and heir. It was rumored at the time that Gustav was homosexual, a possibility asserted by some writers. The close personal relationships that he formed with two of his courtiers, Count Axel von Fersen and Baron Gustav Armfelt, were alluded to in that regard. His sister-in-law Charlotte implied as much in her famous diary.

Professor Erik Lönnroth of the Swedish Academy, who described the assistance provided by Munck, asserted that there is no factual basis for the assumption that Gustav III was homosexual. When his second son was born, there was no doubt as to his legitimacy, and the boy was strong and healthy. King Gustav was especially fond of him and suffered obvious and severe mental and physical reactions to the baby's illness and death. The spring of 1783 has been considered a turning point in the king's personality. After his controversial mother's death in 1782, he found consolation in the birth of the Duke of Småland, but this was followed by severe grief when the child died the following year.

== Politics of an heir apparent ==
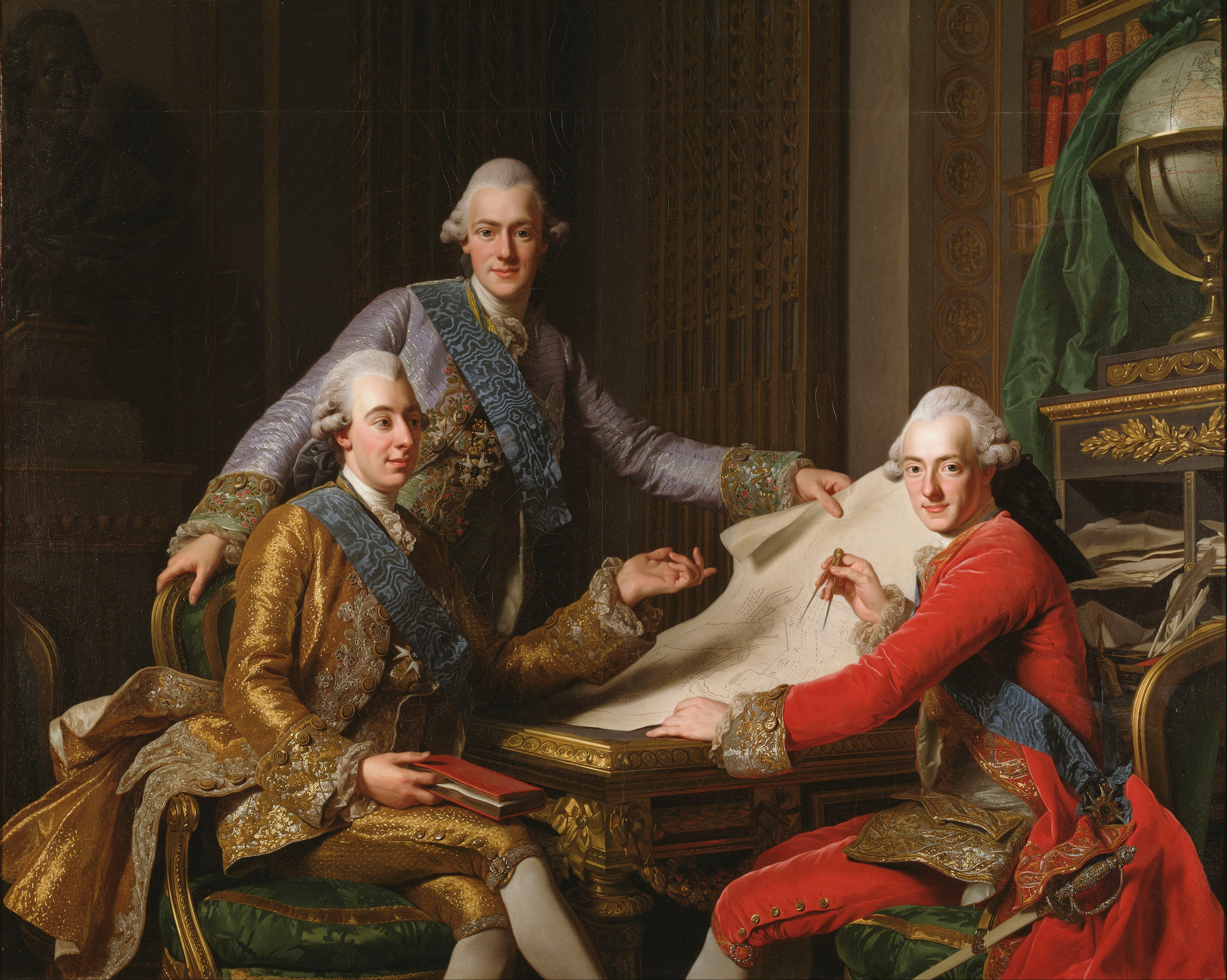
King Gustav III of Sweden and his Brothers; Gustav III (left) and his two brothers, Prince Frederick Adolf and Prince Charles, later Charles XIII. Painting by Alexander Roslin.

Gustav first intervened actively in politics during the December Crisis (1768), when he compelled the dominant Cap faction, which mainly represented the interests of the peasantry and clergy, to summon an extraordinary diet from which he hoped for the reform of the constitution in a way that would increase the power of the crown. But the victorious Hat party, which mainly represented the interests of the aristocracy and military establishment, refused to redeem the pledges that they had given before the previous elections. "That we should have lost the constitutional battle does not distress us so much", wrote Gustav, in the bitterness of his heart; "but what does dismay me is to see my poor nation so sunk in corruption as to place its own felicity in absolute anarchy."

Gustav found greater success abroad. From 4 February to 25 March 1771, Gustav was in Paris, where he carried both the court and the city by storm. The poets and the philosophers paid him enthusiastic homage, and distinguished women testified to his superlative merits. With many of them he maintained a lifelong correspondence. His visit to the French capital was, however, no mere pleasure trip; it was also a political mission. Confidential agents from the Swedish court had already prepared the way for him, and the Duke of Choiseul, the retired Chief Minister, resolved to discuss with him the best method of bringing about a revolution in France's ally, Sweden. Before he departed, the French government undertook to pay the outstanding subsidies to Sweden unconditionally, at the rate of one and a half million livres annually. Count de Vergennes, one of the most prominent French diplomats, was transferred from Constantinople to Stockholm.

On his way home, Gustav paid a short visit to his uncle, Frederick the Great, at Potsdam. Frederick bluntly informed his nephew that, in concert with Russia and Denmark, he had guaranteed the integrity of the existing Swedish constitution; he advised the young monarch to play the part of mediator and abstain from violence.

== Reign and coup d'état ==
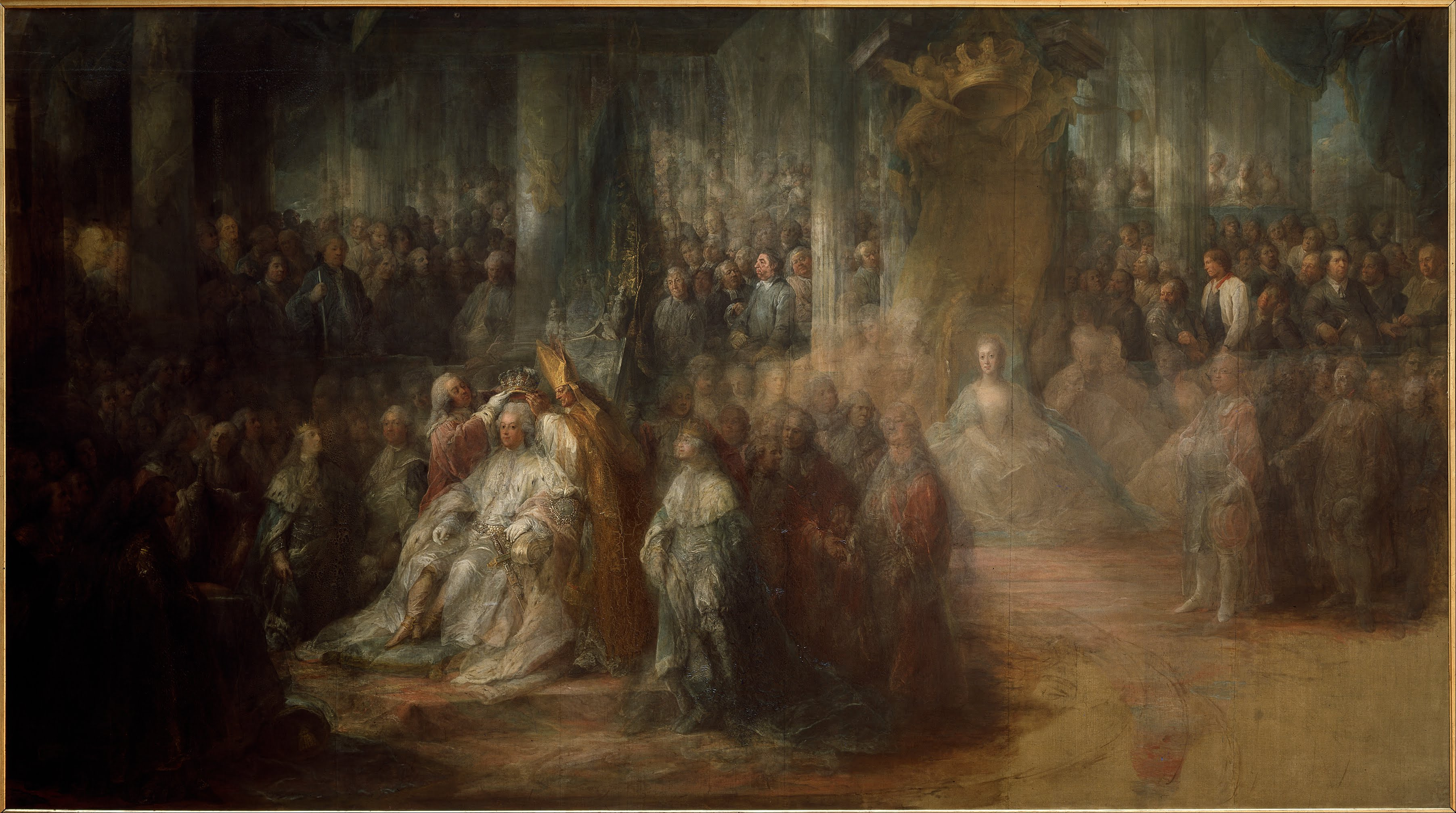
The Coronation of King Gustav III of Sweden by Carl Gustaf Pilo, left unfinished at the artist's death.

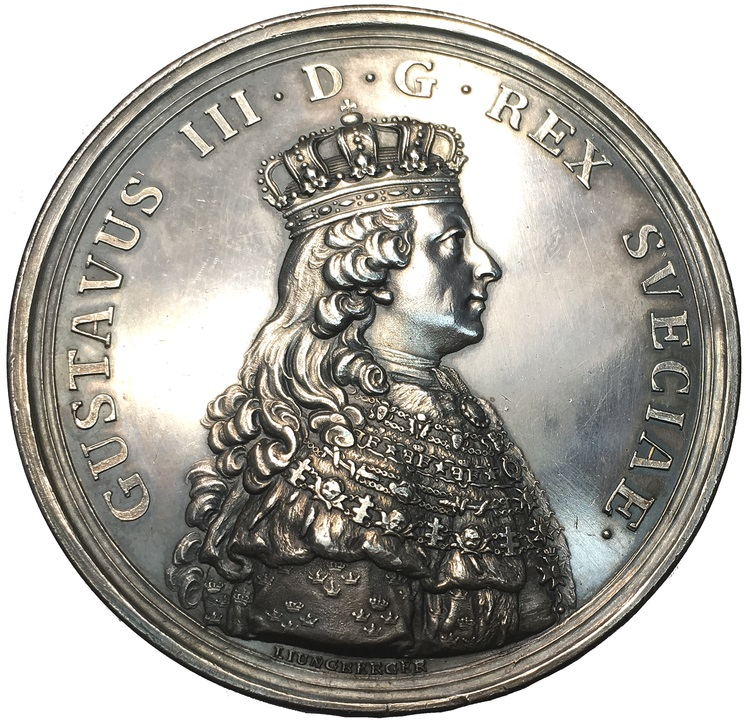
Coronation coin from the coronation of Gustavus III in 1772.

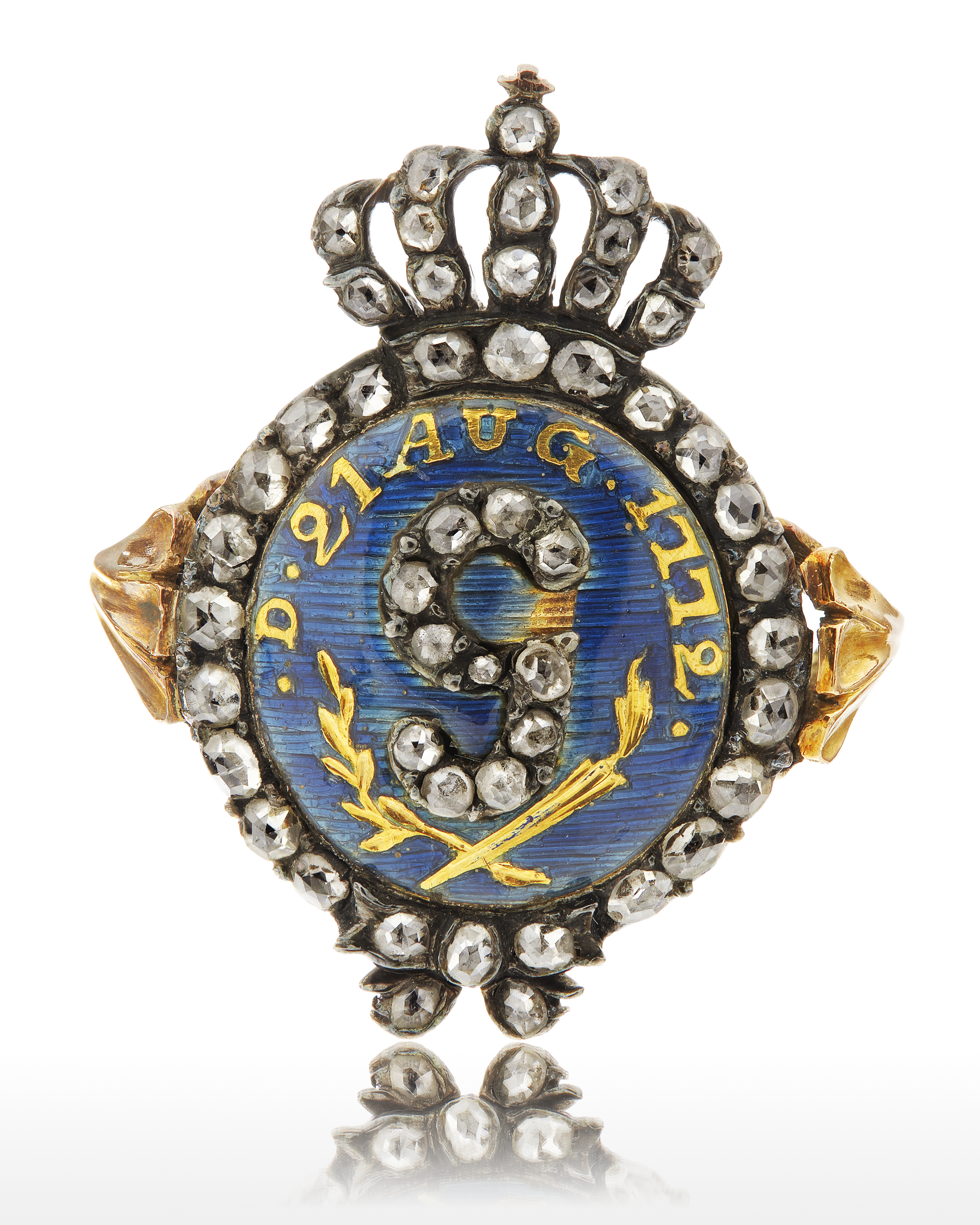
One of Gustav III's revolution rings in memory of the political revolution of 21 August 1772

At the time of his accession, the Swedish Riksdag held more power than the monarchy, but the Riksdag was bitterly divided between rival parties, the Hats and Caps. On his return to Sweden, Gustav III tried unsuccessfully to mediate between the two groups. On 21 June 1771, he opened his first Riksdag with a speech that aroused powerful emotions. It was the first time in more than a century that a Swedish king had addressed a Swedish Riksdag in its native tongue. He stressed the need for all parties to sacrifice their animosities for the common good, and volunteered, as "the first citizen of a free people," to be the mediator between the contending factions. A composition committee was actually formed, but it proved illusory from the first: the patriotism of neither faction was sufficient for the smallest act of self-denial. The subsequent attempts of the dominant Caps to reduce him to a roi fainéant (a powerless king), encouraged him to consider a coup d'état.

Under the sway of the Cap faction, Sweden seemed in danger of falling prey to the political ambitions of Russia. It appeared on the point of being absorbed into the Northern Accord sought by the Russian vice-chancellor, Count Nikita Panin. It seemed to many that only a swift and sudden coup d'état could preserve Sweden's independence.

Gustav III was approached by Jacob Magnus Sprengtporten, a Finnish nobleman, who had incurred the enmity of the Caps, with the prospect of a revolution. He undertook to seize the fortress of Sveaborg in Finland by a coup de main. Once Finland was secured, he intended to embark for Sweden, join up with the king and his friends near Stockholm, and force the estates to accept a new constitution dictated by the king.

At this juncture, the plotters were reinforced by Johan Christopher Toll, another victim of Cap oppression. Toll proposed to raise a second revolt in the province of Scania, and to secure the southern fortress of Kristianstad. After some debate, it was agreed that Kristianstad should openly declare against the government a few days after the Finnish revolt had begun. Duke Charles (Karl), the eldest of the king's brothers, would thereupon be forced to mobilize the garrisons of all the southern fortresses hastily, ostensibly to crush the revolt at Kristianstad, but on arriving in front of the fortress, he was to make common cause with the rebels and march upon the capital from the south while Sprengtporten attacked it simultaneously from the east.

The entire revolutionary enterprise was underwritten with loans procured from the French financier Nicolas Beaujon, arranged by the Swedish ambassador to France, Count Creutz.

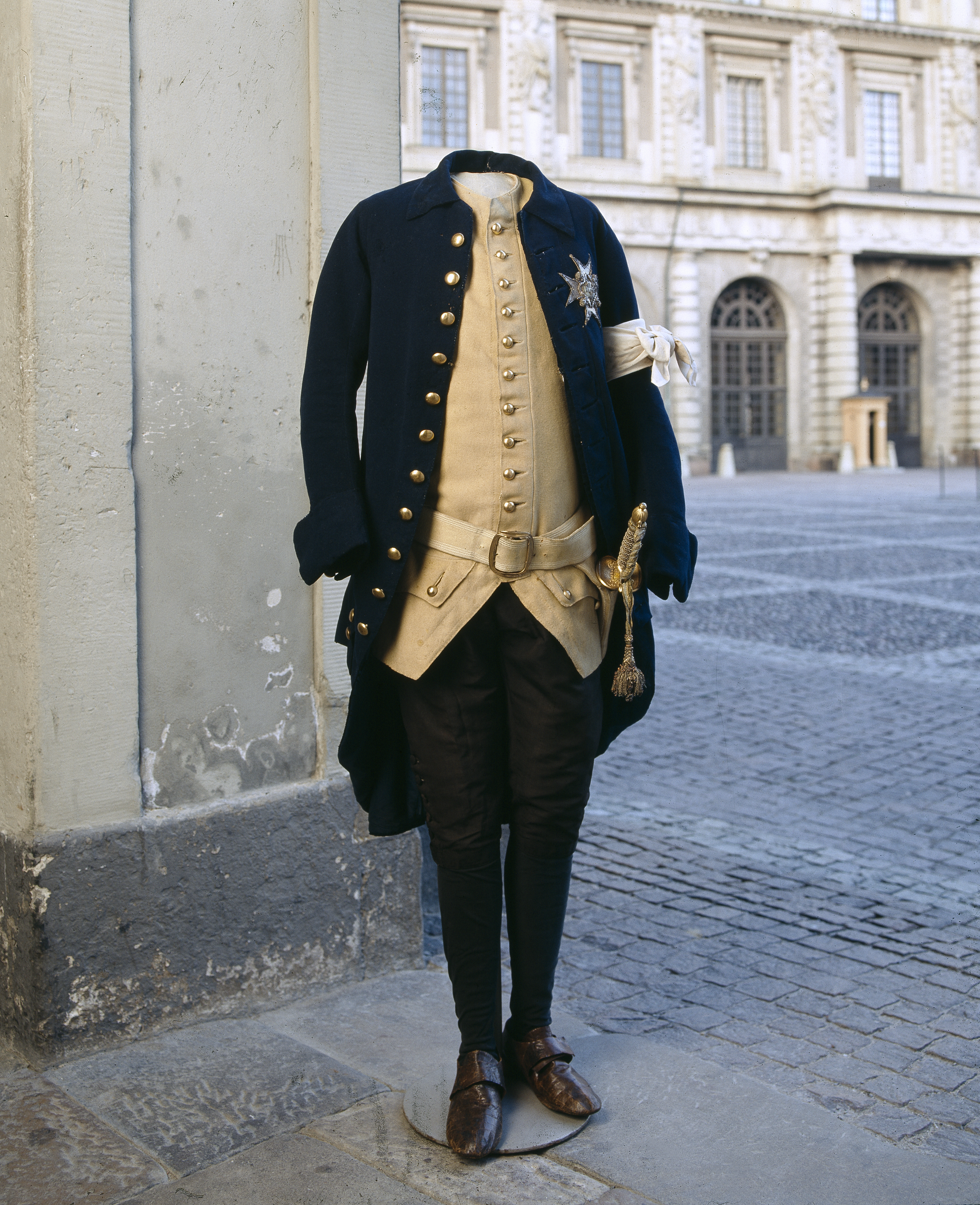
Photo of Gustav III's uniform worn during the coup d'état, 19 August 1772, Livrustkammaren

On 6 August 1772, Toll succeeded in winning the fortress of Kristianstad by sheer bluff, and on 16 August, Sprengtporten succeeded in surprising Sveaborg, but contrary winds prevented him from crossing to Stockholm. Events soon occurred there that made his presence unnecessary in any case.

On 16 August, the Cap leader, Ture Rudbeck, arrived at Stockholm with news of the insurrection in the south, and Gustav found himself isolated in the midst of enemies. Sprengtporten lay weather-bound in Finland, Toll was 800 kilometres (500 miles) away, the Hat leaders were in hiding. Gustav thereupon resolved to strike the decisive blow without waiting for Sprengtporten's arrival.

He acted promptly. On the evening of 18 August, all the officers whom he thought he could trust received secret instructions to assemble in the great square facing the arsenal on the following morning. At ten o'clock on 19 August, Gustav mounted his horse and rode to the arsenal. On the way, his adherents joined him in little groups, as if by accident, so that by the time he reached his destination he had about two hundred officers in his suite.

After parade he reconducted them to the guard-room in the north western wing of the palace where the Guard of Honour had its headquarters and unfolded his plans to them. He told the assembled officers,

"If you follow me, just like your ancestors followed Gustav Vasa and Gustavus Adolphus, then I will risk my life and blood for you and the salvation of the fatherland!"

A young ensign then spoke up:

"We are willing to sacrifice both blood and life in Your Majesty's service!"

Gustav then dictated a new oath of allegiance, and everyone signed it without hesitation. It absolved them from their allegiance to the estates, and bound them solely to obey "their lawful king, Gustav III".

Meanwhile, the Privy Council and its president, Rudbeck, had been arrested and the fleet secured. Then Gustav made a tour of the city and was everywhere received by enthusiastic crowds, who hailed him as a deliverer. A song was composed by Carl Michael Bellman called the "Toast to King Gustav!"

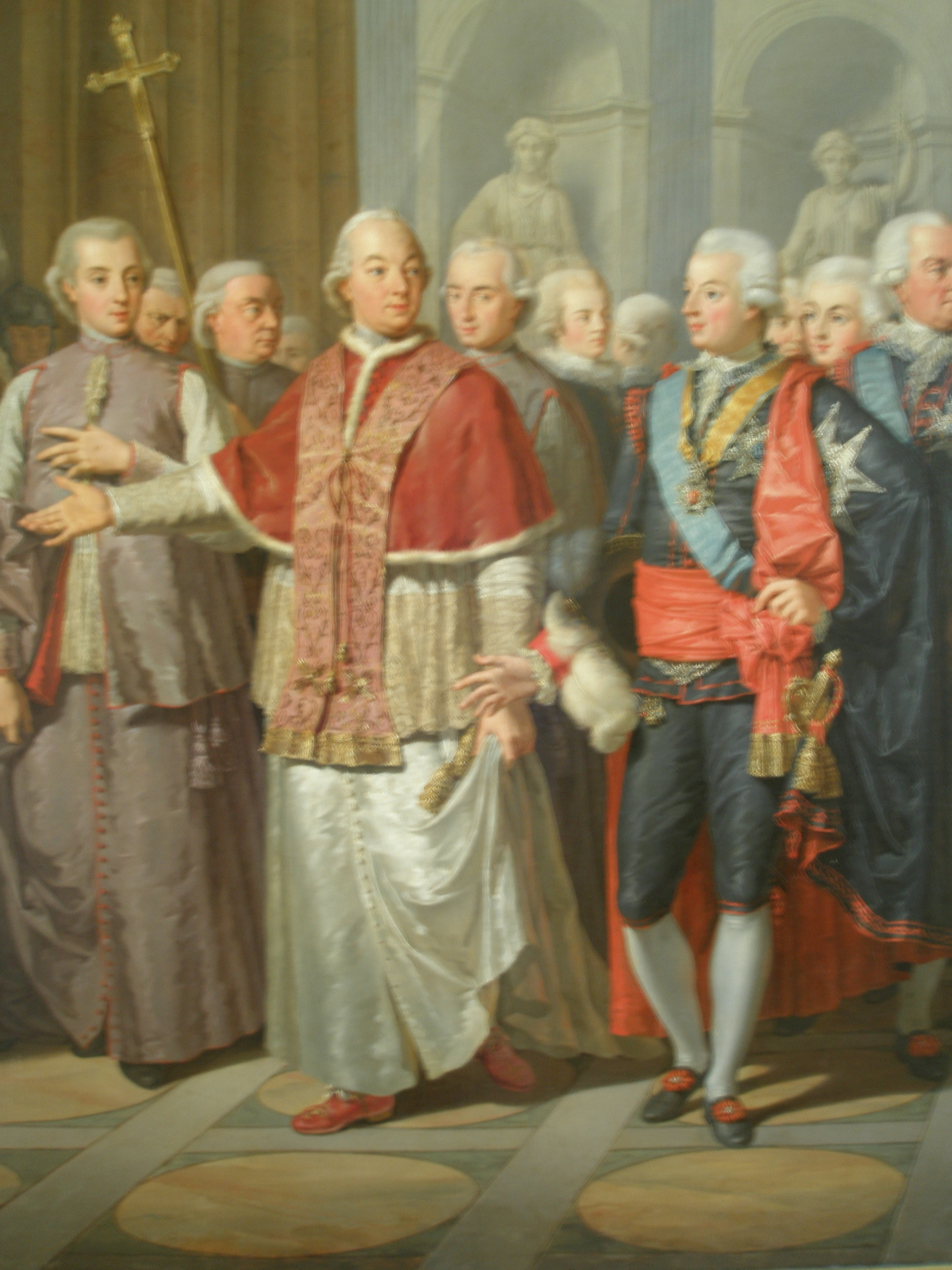
Pope Pius VI and Gustav III

On the evening of 20 August, heralds roamed the streets proclaiming that the estates were to meet at the palace on the following day; every deputy absenting himself would be regarded as the enemy of his country and his king. On 21 August, the king appeared in full regalia. Taking his seat on the throne, he delivered his famous philippic, viewed as one of the masterpieces of Swedish oratory, in which he reproached the estates for their unpatriotic venality and license in the past.

Part of the speech by Gustav III to the Estates:

...has given birth to hatred, hatred to revenge, revenge to persecution, persecution to new revolutions which finally have passed into a period of disease, which has wounded and degraded the whole nation. Ambition and lust for glory on the part of a few people have damaged the realm, and blood has been shed by both parties, and the result of this has been the suffering of the people. The establishment of their own power base has been the sole goal of those ruling, often at the cost of other citizens, and always at the cost of the nation. In times when the law was clear, the law was distorted, and when that was not possible, it was broken. Nothing has been sacred to a populace bent on hatred and revenge, and lunacy has finally reached so far, that it has been assumed that members of parliament are above the law, their not having any other guidance than their own consciences. By this Freedom, the most noble of human rights have been transformed by an unbearable aristocratic despotism in the hands of the ruling party, which in itself has been subdued by few...

A new constitution, the Instrument of Government, was read to the estates and unanimously accepted by them. The diet was then dissolved.

== Between constitutionalism and absolutism ==
Gustav worked towards reform in the same direction as other contemporary sovereigns of the Age of Enlightenment. Criminal justice became more lenient, the death penalty was restricted to a relatively short list of crimes (including murder), and torture was abolished in order to gain confessions, although the "strict death penalty", with torture-like corporal punishment preceding the execution, was maintained.

Gustav took an active part in every department of business, but relied heavily on extra-official counsellors of his own choosing rather than upon the Privy Council of Sweden. The effort to remedy the widespread corruption that had flourished under the Hats and Caps engaged a considerable share of his time and he even found it necessary to put on trial the entire Göta Hovrätt, the superior court of justice, in Jönköping.

Measures were also taken to reform the administration and judicial procedures. In 1774, an ordinance was proclaimed providing for the liberty of the press, though "within certain limits". The national defences were raised to a "Great Power" scale, and the navy was so enlarged as to become one of the most formidable in Europe. The dilapidated finances were set in good order by the "currency realization ordinance" of 1776.

Gustav also introduced new national economic policies. In 1775, free trade in grain was promoted and several oppressive export tolls were abolished. The poor law was amended, and limited religious liberty was proclaimed for both Roman Catholics and Jews. Gustav even designed and popularized a Swedish national costume, which was in general use among the upper classes from 1778 until his death (and it is still worn by the ladies of the court on state occasions). The king's one great economic blunder was his attempt in 1775 to make the sale of alcoholic spirits a government monopoly, through the establishment of a network of crown distilleries. These proved to be unprofitable, and moreover the monopoly was hugely unpopular among the common people, and so Gustav was forced to abolish it in 1786.

Gustav's foreign policy, in contrast, was at first both restrained and cautious. Thus, when the king summoned the estates to assemble at Stockholm on 3 September 1778, he could give a highly positive account of his six years' stewardship. The Riksdag was quite obsequious towards the king. "There was no room for a single question during the whole session."

Short as the session was, it was long enough for the deputies to realize that their political supremacy was over. They had changed places with the king. He was now their sovereign lord. He guarded the royal prerogative fiercely and plainly showed that he would continue to do so.

Even those who were prepared to acquiesce in the change by no means liked it. If the Riksdag of 1778 had been docile, the Riksdag of 1786 was mutinous. The consequence was that nearly all the royal propositions were either rejected outright or so modified that Gustav himself withdrew them.

Earlier in foreign affairs, however, and privately, Gustav had shown considerable interest in the American Revolution and had this to say about it in October 1776:

It is such an interesting drama to see a nation create itself, that I – if I now had not been who I am – would go to America to follow up close every phase in the emergence of this new republic. – This perhaps is America's century. The new republic, which hardly has a population put together better than Rome had to begin with, may perhaps take advantage of Europe some day, in the same manner as Europe has taken advantage of America for two centuries. No matter what, I cannot help but admire their courage and enthusiastically appreciate their daring.

King Gustav III's confidants were called Gustavians. Four of them were of Finnish origin: Gustaf Mauritz Armfelt, August Philip Armfelt, Johan Albrecht Ehrenström, and Johan Fredrik Aminoff who also rose to prominent positions during the period of the Grand Duchy of Finland.

== Increased royal power ==
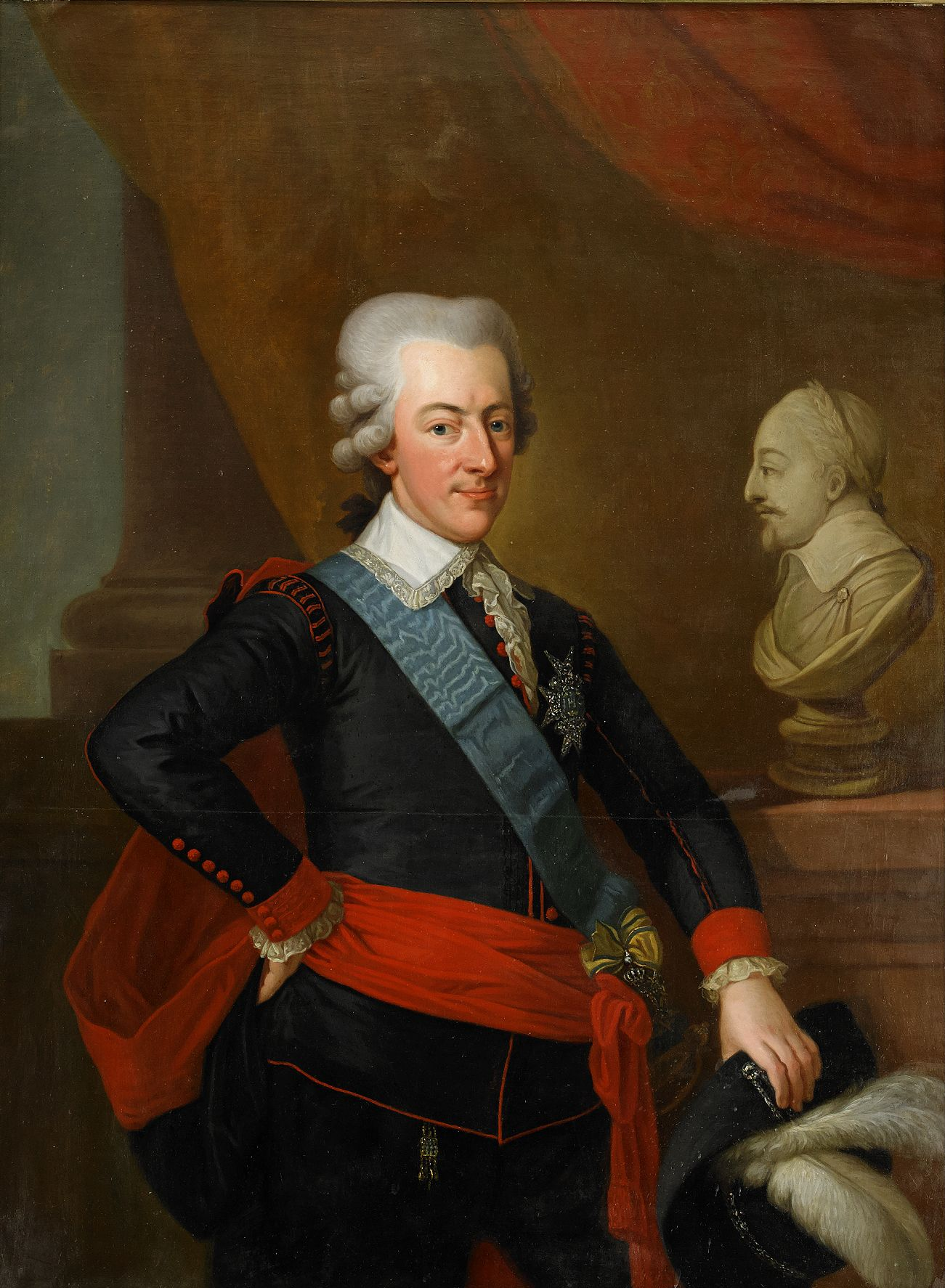
Portrait of Gustav III in 1786 by Per Krafft the Elder

The Riksdag of 1786 marks a turning-point in Gustav's history. Henceforth he showed a growing determination to rule without a parliament, a cautious and gradual passage from semi-constitutionalism to semi-absolutism.

At the same time, his foreign policy became more adventurous. At first he sought to gain Russian support to acquire Norway from Denmark. When Catherine the Great refused to abandon her ally Denmark, Gustav declared war on Russia in June 1788, while it was deeply engaged in a war with the Ottoman Empire to the south. In embarking on a war of aggression without the consent of the estates, Gustav violated his own constitution of 1772, which led to a serious mutiny, the Anjala Conspiracy, among his aristocratic officers in Finland. Denmark declared war in support of its Russian ally, but was soon persuaded to sign a ceasefire through British and Prussian diplomacy.

Returning to Sweden, Gustav aroused popular indignation against the mutinous aristocratic officers. Ultimately, he quelled their rebellion and arrested its leaders. Capitalizing on the powerful anti-aristocratic passions thus aroused, Gustav summoned a Riksdag early in 1789, at which he put through an Act of Union and Security on 17 February 1789 with the backing of the three lower estates. This reinforced monarchical authority significantly, although the estates retained the power of the purse. In return, Gustav abolished most of the old privileges of the nobility.

== Russo-Swedish War (1788–1790) ==
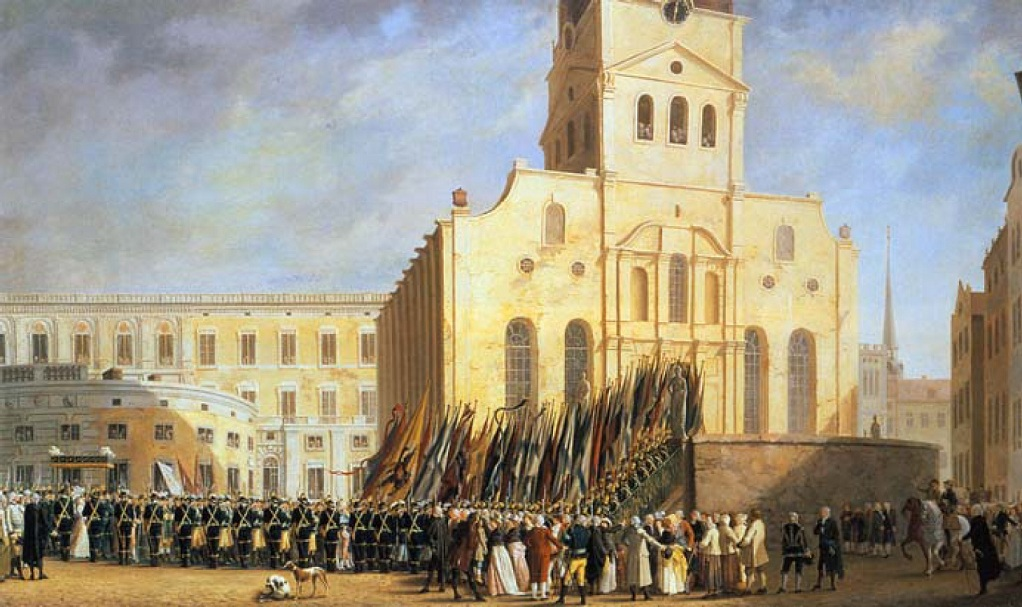
Trophies from the Battle of Svensksund brought into Stockholm Cathedral, painting by Pehr Hilleström

Throughout 1789 and 1790, Gustav conducted a war with Russia known as the Russo-Swedish War of 1788–1790. At first, the venture seemed headed for disaster before the Swedes successfully broke a blockade by the Russian fleet at the Battle of Svensksund on 9 July 1790. This is regarded as the greatest naval victory ever achieved by the Swedish Navy. The Russians lost one-third of their fleet and 7,000 men. A month later, on 14 August 1790, a peace treaty was signed between Russia and Sweden: the Treaty of Värälä. Only eight months before, Catherine had declared that "the odious and revolting aggression" of the king of Sweden would be "forgiven" only if he "testified his repentance" by agreeing to a peace granting a general and unlimited amnesty to all his rebels and consenting to a guarantee by the Swedish Riksdag for the observance of peace in the future ("as it would be imprudent to confide in his good faith alone"). The Treaty of Värälä spared Sweden from any such humiliating concession, and in October 1791, Gustav concluded an eight years' defensive alliance with the empress, who thereby bound herself to pay her new ally an annual subsidy of 300,000 rubles.

Gustav next aimed at forming a league of princes against the revolutionary government in France, and subordinated every other consideration to this goal. His profound knowledge of popular assemblies enabled him, alone among contemporary sovereigns, to gauge the scope of the French Revolution accurately from the first. He was hampered, however, by financial restrictions and lack of support from the other European powers. Then, after the brief Diet of Gävle on 22 January – 24 February 1792, he fell victim to a widespread political conspiracy among his aristocratic enemies.

== Assassination ==
Assassination of Gustav III
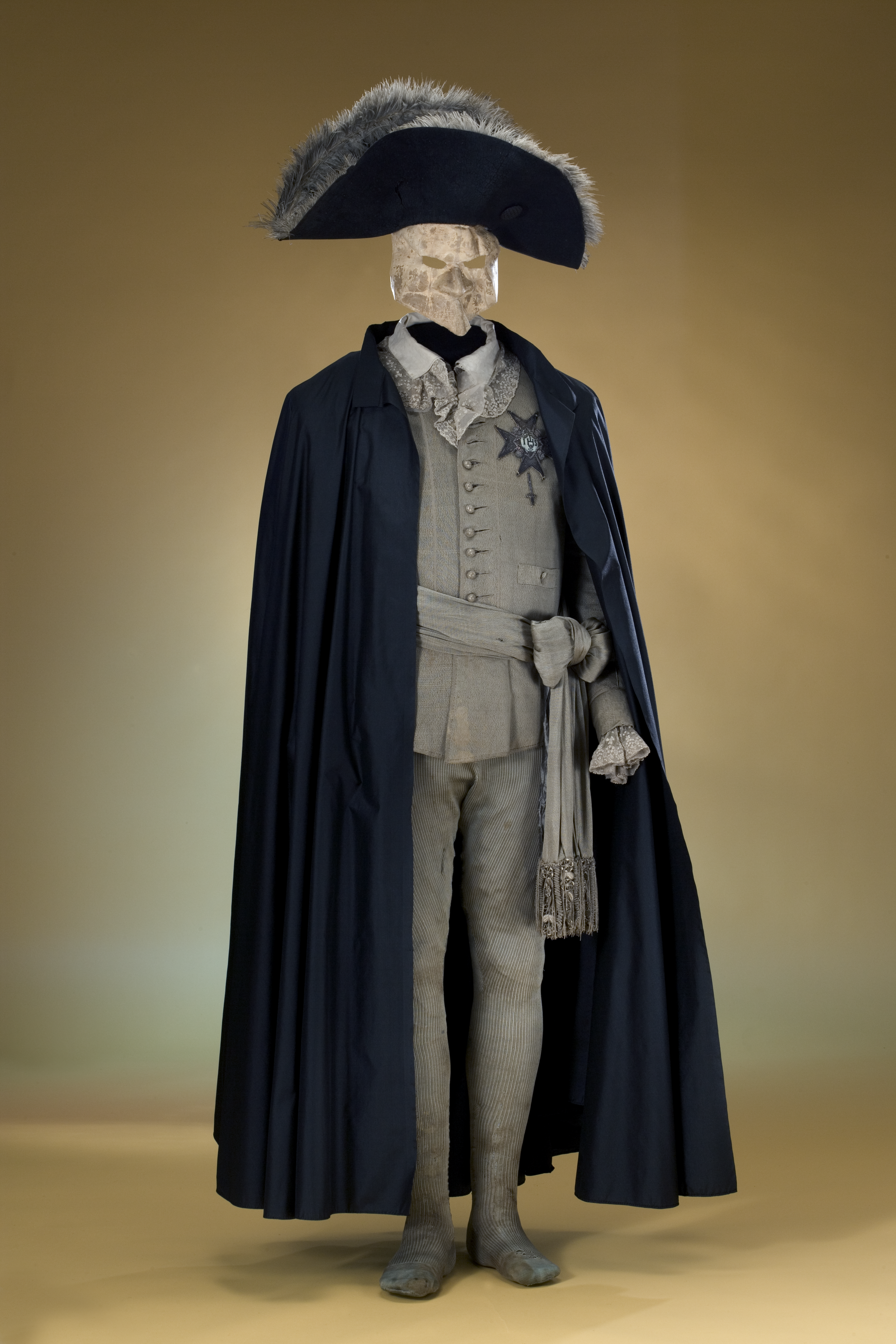
- Gustav's outfit during the assassination
- Location: Royal Opera House, Stockholm
- Date: 16 March 1792
- Target: Gustav III
- Attack type: Assassination, shooting
- Weapons: Flintlock pistol, knife
- Deaths: 1
- Perpetrators: Jacob Johan Anckarström, Adolph Ribbing, Claes Fredrik Horn, Carl Pontus Lilliehorn, and Carl Fredrik Pechlin

Gustav III's war against Russia and his implementation of the Union and Security Act of 1789 helped increase hatred of the king amongst the nobility, which had been growing ever since the coup d'état of 1772. In the winter of 1791–92, members of the nobility began a conspiracy to assassinate the king and reform the constitution. The conspirators included Jacob Johan Anckarström, Adolph Ribbing, Claes Fredrik Horn, Carl Pontus Lilliehorn and Carl Fredrik Pechlin. Anckarström was chosen to carry out the murder with pistols and knives, but there has also been evidence suggesting that Ribbing was the one who actually shot Gustav.

The assassination of the king occurred at a masked ball at the Royal Opera House in Stockholm at midnight on 16 March 1792. Gustav had arrived earlier that evening to enjoy a dinner in the company of friends. During dinner, he received an anonymous letter that described a threat to his life from Life Guards Colonel Lilliehorn, but, as the king had received numerous threatening letters in the past, he chose to ignore it. The letter was written in French and in translation stated:

To the King — with the greatest humility.

Pray, allow an unknown whose pen is guided by tactfulness and the voice of conscience, dare take the liberty to inform You, with all possible sincerity, that certain individuals exist, both in the Provinces and here in the City, that only breathe hatred and revenge against You; indeed to the extreme of wanting to shorten Your days, through murder.

They are greatly upset to see this not happening at the last masquerade but they rejoice at the tidings of seeing that there will be a new one today. Bandits do not like lanterns; there is nothing more serviceable for an assassination than darkness and disguise. I dare, then, to appeal to You, by everything that is holy in this world, to postpone this damnable ball, to such times as are more positive for Your present as well as coming benefit...

To dare any possible assassins, the King went out into an open box facing the opera stage. And after roughly ten minutes he said "this would have been an opportunity to shoot. Come, let us go down. The ball seems to be merry and bright." The King with Baron Hans Henrik von Essen by his right arm went around the theatre once and then into the foyer where they met Captain Carl Fredrik Pollet.

The King, von Essen and Pollet continued through a corridor leading from the foyer towards the opera stage where the dancing took place. On the stage several masked men – some witnesses talked of 20 or 30 men – made it impossible for the king to proceed. Due to the crowd, Pollet receded behind the King, who bent backwards to talk to Pollet.

Anckarström stood with Ribbing next to him at the entrance to the corridor holding a knife in his left hand and carrying one pistol in his left inner pocket and another pistol in his right back pocket. They edged themselves behind the King, Anckarström took out the pistol from his left inner pocket, then either he or Ribbing pulled the trigger with the gun in Anckarström's hand. Because of the King turning backwards the shot went in at an angle from the third lumbar vertebra towards the hip region.

The King twitched and said "aee" without falling. Anckarström then lost courage, dropped the pistol and knife and shouted fire. People from the King's lifeguard stood some meters away. When they reached the King, they heard him say in French "Aï, je suis blessé" (Ouch, I am wounded).

The king was carried back to his quarters, and the exits of the Opera were sealed. Anckarström was arrested the following morning and immediately confessed to the murder, although he denied a conspiracy until informed that Horn and Ribbing had also been arrested and had confessed in full.

The king had not been shot dead; he was alive and continued to function as head of state. The coup was a failure in the short run. However, the wound became infected, and on 29 March 1792, the king finally died with these last words:

Jag känner mig sömnig, några ögonblicks vila skulle göra mig gott ("I feel sleepy, a few moments' rest would do me good")

Gustav's gunshot wound was not initially considered life-threatening; reexamined evidence allows that the sudden serious infection that killed him almost immediately, 13 days into his convalescence, may have been caused chemically by attending surgeon Daniel Théel who was a known opponent of his.

Ulrica Arfvidsson, the famous medium of the Gustavian era, had told him something that could be interpreted as a prediction of his assassination in 1786, when he visited her anonymously – a coincidence – but she was known to have a large network of informers all over town to help her with her predictions, and she was in fact interrogated about the murder.

== Funeral ==
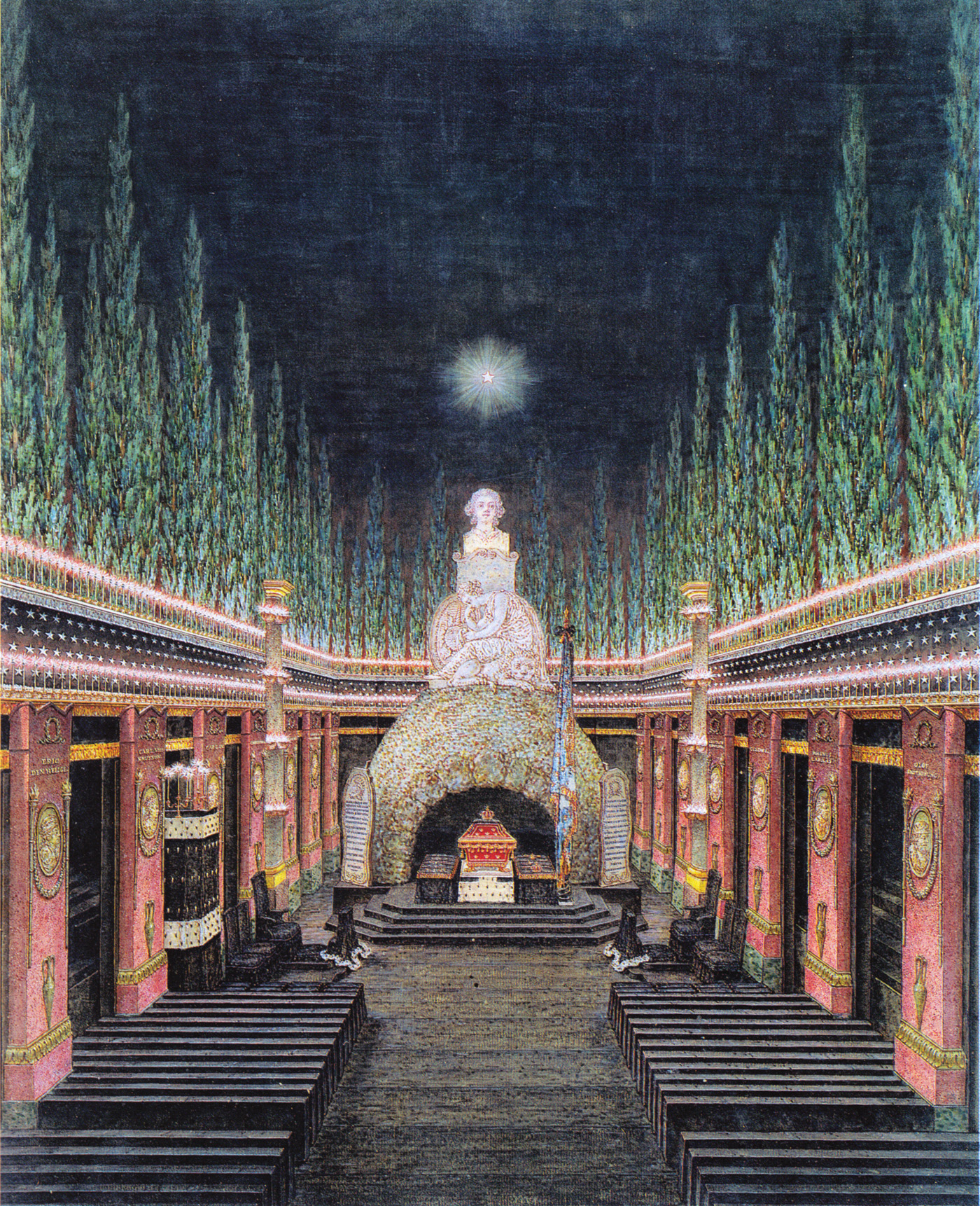
The decorations at the funeral

Gustav's funeral took place on 14 May 1792. It was held in Riddarholmskyrkan, which had been decorated in a grand manner.

For the funeral, Joseph Martin Kraus composed a funeral march to a text of Carl Gustaf af Leopold that was performed by the solo singers Caroline Müller, Franziska Stading, Kristofer Kristian Karsten and Carl Stenborg, choir and orchestra from the Royal Swedish Opera under the direction of the composer himself.

== Contributions to culture ==
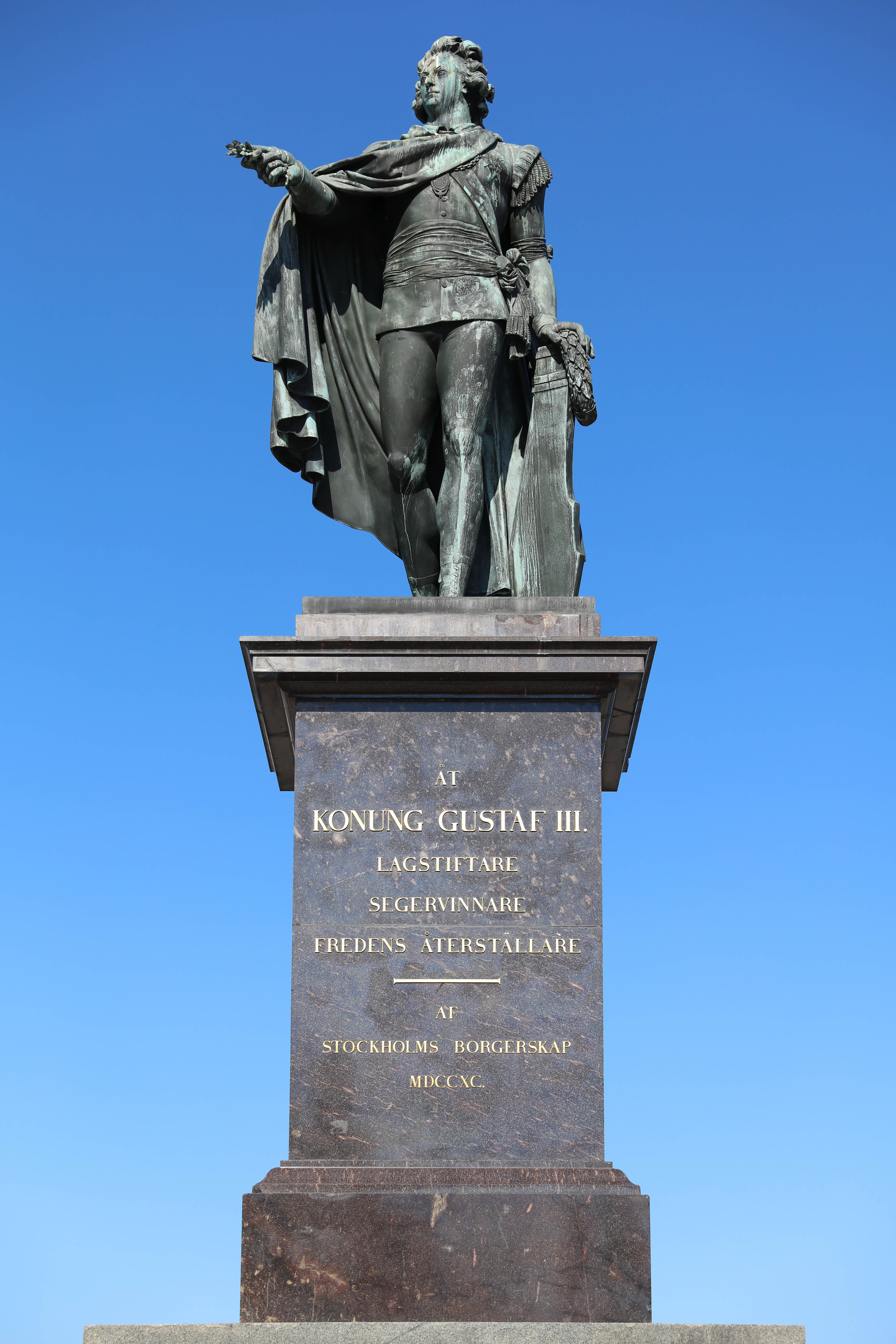
Gustav as Apollo Belvedere dressed in the uniform of the Swedish Coastal Navy (Skärgårdsflottan), landing on the quays of Stockholm, returning from the war to offer a twig of peace to the burghers of Stockholm. Statue at Skeppsbron by Johan Tobias Sergel.

Although he may be charged with many foibles and extravagances, Gustav III is regarded one of the leading sovereigns of the 18th century for patronage of the arts. He was very fond of the performing and visual arts, as well as literature.

Gustav was also active as a playwright. He is largely credited with creating the Royal Theatre (Kungliga Teatern), where his own historical dramas were performed, and he promoted the careers of many native singers and actors, among them the dramatic stars Fredrique Löwen and Lars Hjortsberg and the operatic stars Elisabeth Olin and Christoffer Christian Karsten, by letting them perform in his plays or in his commissioned operas, respectively. In 1773 he founded the Royal Swedish Opera and the Royal Swedish Ballet under the umbrella of his Royal Theatre. A new opera house was built in 1775 and inaugurated in 1782, connected to the Stockholm Palace by the Norrbro bridge. Until 1788, spoken drama was also performed in the opera house. Gustav then founded a separate entity for spoken drama, the Royal Dramatic Theatre, with a new building behind the Royal Swedish Opera house.

He became a Freemason in 1780, and introduced the Rite of Strict Observance into Sweden. That year, he named his brother, the Duke of Södermanland (later Charles XIII), to the office of Grand Master for the Grand Lodge of Sweden. The Grand Lodge conferred upon him the title "Vicarius Salomonis" (Vicar of Solomon).

=== Opera ===
Notable opera composers under Gustav's reign were three artists originally from Germany: Johann Gottlieb Naumann, Georg Joseph Vogler and Joseph Martin Kraus. All of them succeeded in adapting their musical origins to Swedish national dramatic style, a process sometimes overseen by the king (notably in the layout of the libretto for the opera Gustav Wasa from 1786).

It was in the foyer of the opera house that King Gustav III was assassinated. This incident became the basis of an opera libretto by Eugène Scribe set by Daniel Auber in 1833 under the title Gustave III, by Saverio Mercadante in 1843 as Il Reggente, and by Giuseppe Verdi in 1859 as Un ballo in maschera (A Masked Ball), with the specifics changed under the pressure of censorship.

It is widely agreed that the contribution and dedication of Gustav III to the performing arts in Sweden, notably the building of the theatre houses and the founding of a national theatre company, has been crucial to the Swedish culture. The era of opera during his time is referred to today as the Gustavian Opera.

=== Balloon ===
Following Gustav III's visit to Lyon, the aeronautics pioneers Montgolfier brothers in June 1784 launched a new hot air balloon called Gustave in honor of the Swedish king, in which the first ever female aeronaut, singer Élisabeth Thible, took to the air.

== Saint-Barthélemy and Gustavia ==
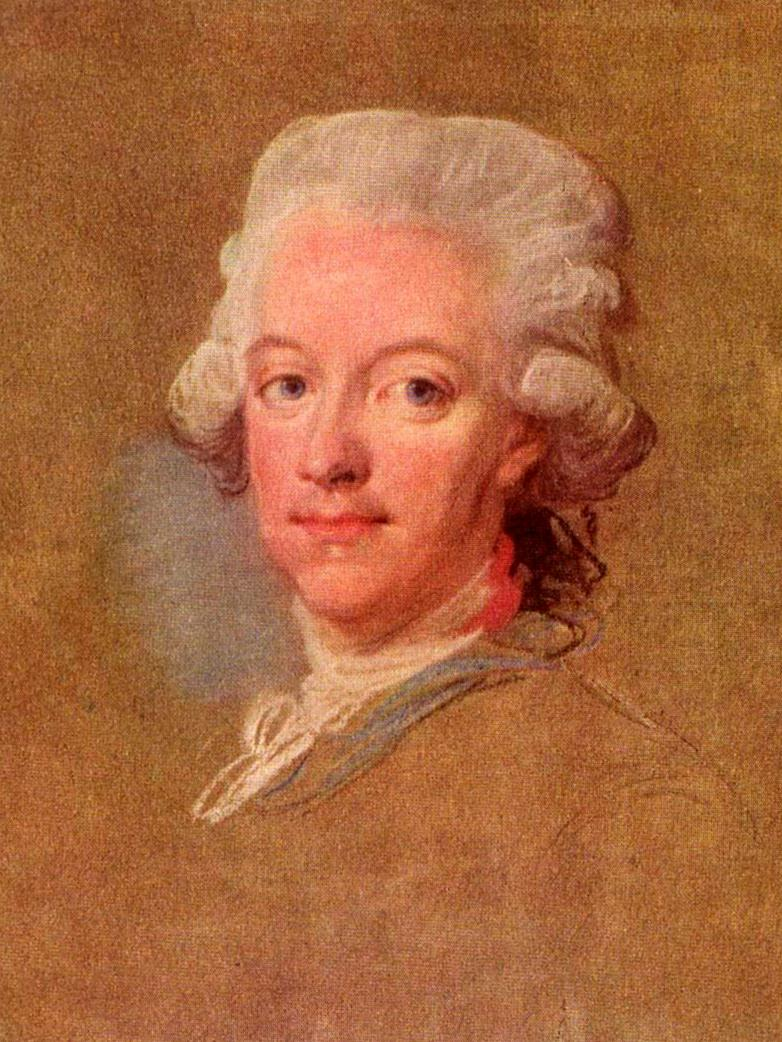
Portrait of Gustav III by Lorens Pasch the Younger, c. 1785

It was under King Gustav III that Sweden gained the small Caribbean island of Saint-Barthélemy from France in 1785 (in exchange for French trading rights in Gothenburg).

The island's capital still bears the name Gustavia in honour of Gustav III. Though it was sold back to France in 1878, many streets and locations there still carry Swedish names, including the airport which was named after him. Also, the Swedish national arms, the three crowns, appear in the island's coat of arms along with insignia of the island's two other previous owners: three fleurs-de-lis representing France and a Maltese cross representing the Knights of Saint John.

=== Plan to colonise Australia 1786–1787 ===
While the British were preparing to establish a colony in Botany Bay, the Government of Gustav III agreed to sponsor William Bolts' proposal for an equivalent venture in Nuyts Land (part of the south-western coast of Australia). The war with Russia caused this venture to be abandoned.

== Ancestors ==
Ancestors of Gustav III

16. Frederick III, Duke of Holstein-Gottorp (=22)
8. Christian Albert, Duke of Holstein-Gottorp
17. Marie Elisabeth of Saxony (=23)
4. Christian August of Holstein-Gottorp, Prince of Eutin
18. Frederick III of Denmark
9. Frederikke Amalie of Denmark
19. Sophie Amalie of Brunswick-Lüneburg
2. Adolf Frederick of Sweden
20. Friedrich VI, Margrave of Baden-Durlach
10. Frederick VII, Margrave of Baden-Durlach
21. Christina Magdalena of the Palatinate-Zweibrücken
5. Albertina Frederica of Baden-Durlach
22. Frederick III, Duke of Holstein-Gottorp (=16)
11. Augusta Marie of Holstein-Gottorp
23. Marie Elisabeth of Saxony (=17)
1. Gustav III of Sweden
24. Frederick William, Elector of Brandenburg
12. Frederick I of Prussia
25. Louise Henriette of Orange-Nassau
6. Frederick William I of Prussia
26. Ernest Augustus, Elector of Hanover (=28)
13. Sophia Charlotte of Hanover
27. Sophia of Hanover (=29)
3. Louisa Ulrika of Prussia
28. Ernest Augustus, Elector of Hanover (=26)
14. George I of Great Britain
29. Sophia of Hanover (=27)
7. Sophia Dorothea of Hanover
30. George William, Duke of Brunswick-Lüneburg
15. Sophia Dorothea of Celle
31. Eleonore d'Esmier d'Olbreuse

== See also ==
- Absolute Monarchy in Sweden
- Anno 1790 (Swedish 2011 television series set in Stockholm in 1790–1792)
- Culture of Sweden
- The Funeral of Gustav III
- Gustav III of Sweden's coffee experiment
- Gustavian era
- Gustavians
- Gustavian style
- History of Sweden
- List of coups d'état and coup attempts by country
- Marstrand Free Port
- Swedish slave trade
- Swedish-Algerian War (1791–1792)

== Notes ==
Gustav III House of Holstein-Gottorp Cadet branch of the House of Oldenburg Born: 24 January 1746 Died: 29 March 1792
Regnal titles
| Preceded by Adolf Fredrik | King of Sweden; 1771–1792 | Succeeded by Gustav IV Adolf |
