= Anglo-Prussian Alliance (1756) =

Military alliance between Great Britain and Prussia

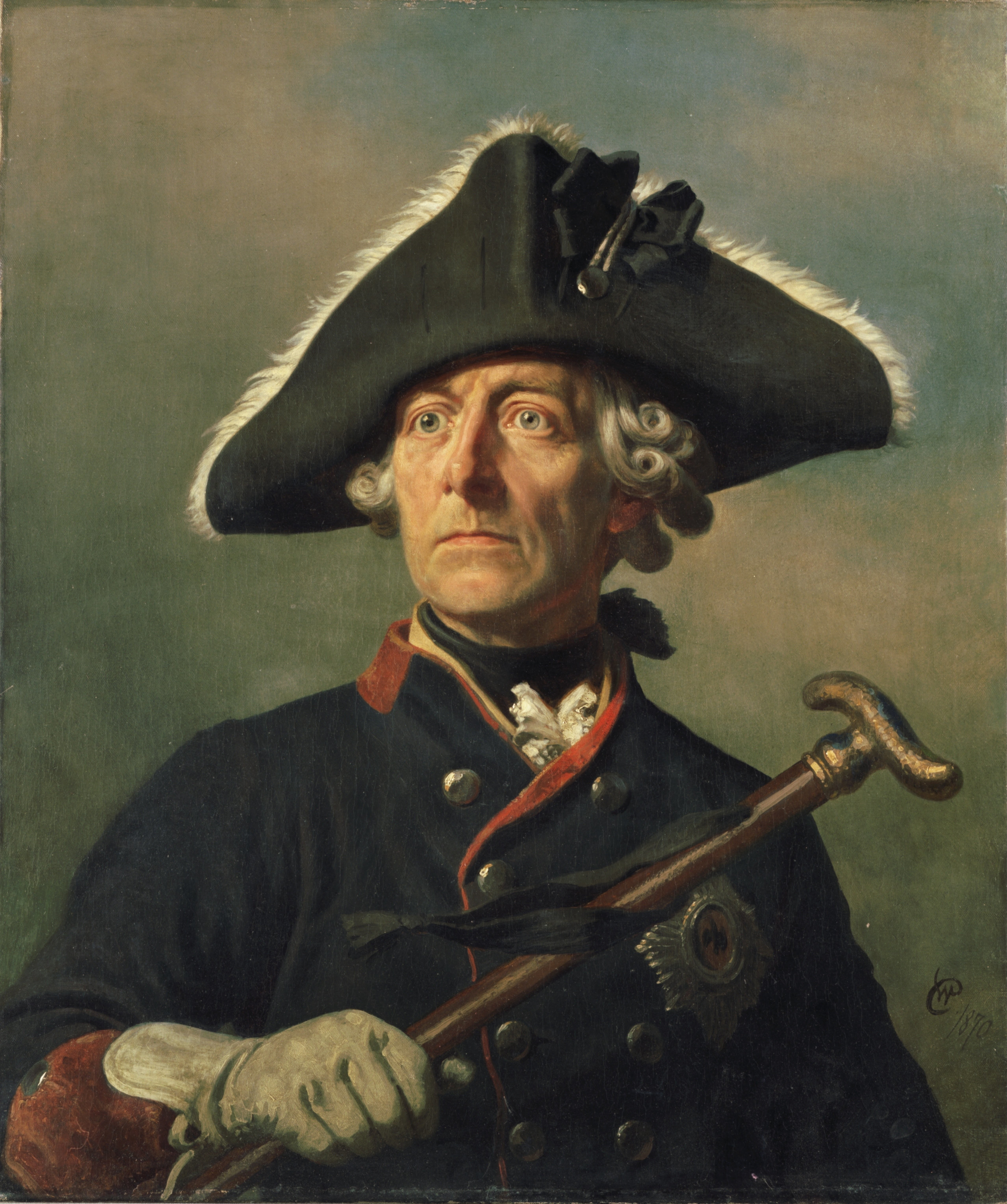
Frederick the Great, King of Prussia during the alliance. He was the nephew of George II and first cousin once removed of George III, the respective sovereigns of Great Britain and Hanover.

The Anglo-Prussian Alliance was a military alliance created by the Westminster Convention between Great Britain and Prussia that lasted formally between 1756 and 1762, during the Seven Years' War. The alliance allowed Britain to concentrate most of its efforts against the colonial possessions of the French-led coalition while Prussia bore the brunt of the fighting in Europe. The alliance ended in the final months of the conflict, but strong ties remained between both kingdoms.

== Background ==
Since 1731, Britain had been tied to Prussia's major rival, Austria, by the Anglo-Austrian Alliance. Prussia had been allied to Britain's enemy, France. After the War of the Austrian Succession, Austria had lost the valuable province of Silesia, and Empress Maria Theresa tried to gain British support for a proposed military action to reclaim it. When the British government refused, she grew disenchanted with it and in 1756 made an alliance with France.

Suddenly without a major ally in Continental Europe, the British hastily concluded a similar pact with Frederick the Great of Prussia in the hope of forestalling a major European war by maintaining the European balance of power. Prussia had a number of leading British supporters, including William Pitt the Elder.

== Treaty ==
Treaty of Westminster
- Type: Bilateral treaty
- Signed: 16 January 1756
- Location: Westminster, England, Great Britain
- Original signatories: Great Britain; Prussia
- Ratifiers: Great Britain; Prussia

The Treaty of Westminster was a treaty of neutrality signed on 16 January 1756 between Frederick the Great of Prussia and King George II of Great Britain, Elector of Hanover. The development was caused by British fears of a French attack on Hanover. The terms stated that Prussia and Great Britain would seek to prevent any foreign power's forces from passing through the Holy Roman Empire and was part of the Diplomatic Revolution.

== In practice ==
Although the British had hoped to avoid war, Frederick launched a pre-emptive strike against Austria in August 1756. He overran Saxony but was soon faced with an onslaught of enemies, including France, Austria, Sweden and Russia, and so was forced to retreat from Bohemia. By 1757, it appeared that without substantive British assistance, Prussia would soon collapse.

Frederick had established a large and well-disciplined army, but it was continually short of money. The British began to send large financial subsidies to support their ally.

On 11 April 1758, both states concluded the Anglo-Prussian Convention, which formalised their alliance. Neither side would make peace without consulting the other.

After the occupation of Emden, a British contingent was despatched to the continent to serve with the Duke of Brunswick, a Prussian ally. That served to shield Frederick's western flank and allowed him to focus elsewhere.

Under Prussian pressure, the British-backed Hanoverian government repudiated the Convention of Klosterzeven and re-entered the war on Prussia's side. In spite of British aid, the Prussian war effort still nearly collapsed in 1759, despite an Allied victory at the Battle of Minden.

However, until the end of the war, events turned largely in the favour of the Anglo-Prussian allies. Britain had enjoyed an annus mirabilis in 1759 by defeating France in Europe, North America and Asia and by repelling a planned French invasion. Britain won a number of key victories over Spain in 1762, and Empress Elisabeth of Russia died, which made Russia withdraw from the war against Prussia.

== Dissolution ==
The alliance was eventually dissolved in 1762, when Britain withdrew financial and military support for Prussian war aims in Continental Europe. Frederick the Great accused Lord Bute of a plot to destroy the Prussian monarchy.

Britain won more favourable terms the next year at the Treaty of Paris by gaining a number of the colonial possessions that it had captured from France and Spain. Prussia retained Silesia but failed to achieve the acquisition of further large territories for which it had hoped during the outbreak of war.

Both powers made distinctly-separate peace agreements to end the war. In the years after the war, their relationship deteriorated, with Prussia rejecting approaches from Britain to form a similar alliance before and during the American War of Independence. Prussia concluded the Russo-Prussian Alliance in 1764 instead, and Britain remained diplomatically isolated.

After the American War of Independence, Britain and Prussia returned to closer ties. They co-operated during the Dutch Patriot Revolt in 1787 and formed part of a Triple Alliance with the Dutch Republic in 1788. After the outbreak of the French Revolution, both Britain and Prussia took part in the various coalitions that were formed against France.

The dissolution of the alliance by Britain created long-lasting distrust by Prussians of the British. In the late 19th century, Otto von Bismarck wrote that Prussians were still distrustful of the British due to their desertion of Frederick the Great.

== See also ==
- Great Britain in the Seven Years' War
- Anglo-French Alliance
- Anglo-Austrian Alliance
- Franco-Austrian Alliance
- Anglo-Prussian Alliance (1788)
- Germany–United Kingdom relations

== Bibliography ==
- Anderson, Fred. Crucible of War: The Seven Years' War and the Fate of Empire in British North America, 1754-1766. Faber and Faber, 2001
- Browning, Reed. The Duke of Newcastle. Yale University Press, 1975.
- Dull, Jonathan R. The French Navy and the Seven Years' War. University of Nebraska Press, 2005.
- McLynn, Frank. 1759: The Year Britain Became Master of the World. Pimlico, 2005.
- Murphy, Orvile T. Charles Gravier: Comete de Vergennes: French Diplomacy in the Age of Revolution. New York Press, 1982.
- Simms, Brendan. Three Victories and a Defeat: The Rise and Fall of the First British Empire. Penguin Books, 2008.
- Whiteley, Peter. Lord North: The Prime Minister who lost America. The Hambledon Press, 1996.
