= Russo-Prussian alliance =

1764 mutual defense pact between the Kingdom of Prussia and the Russian Empire

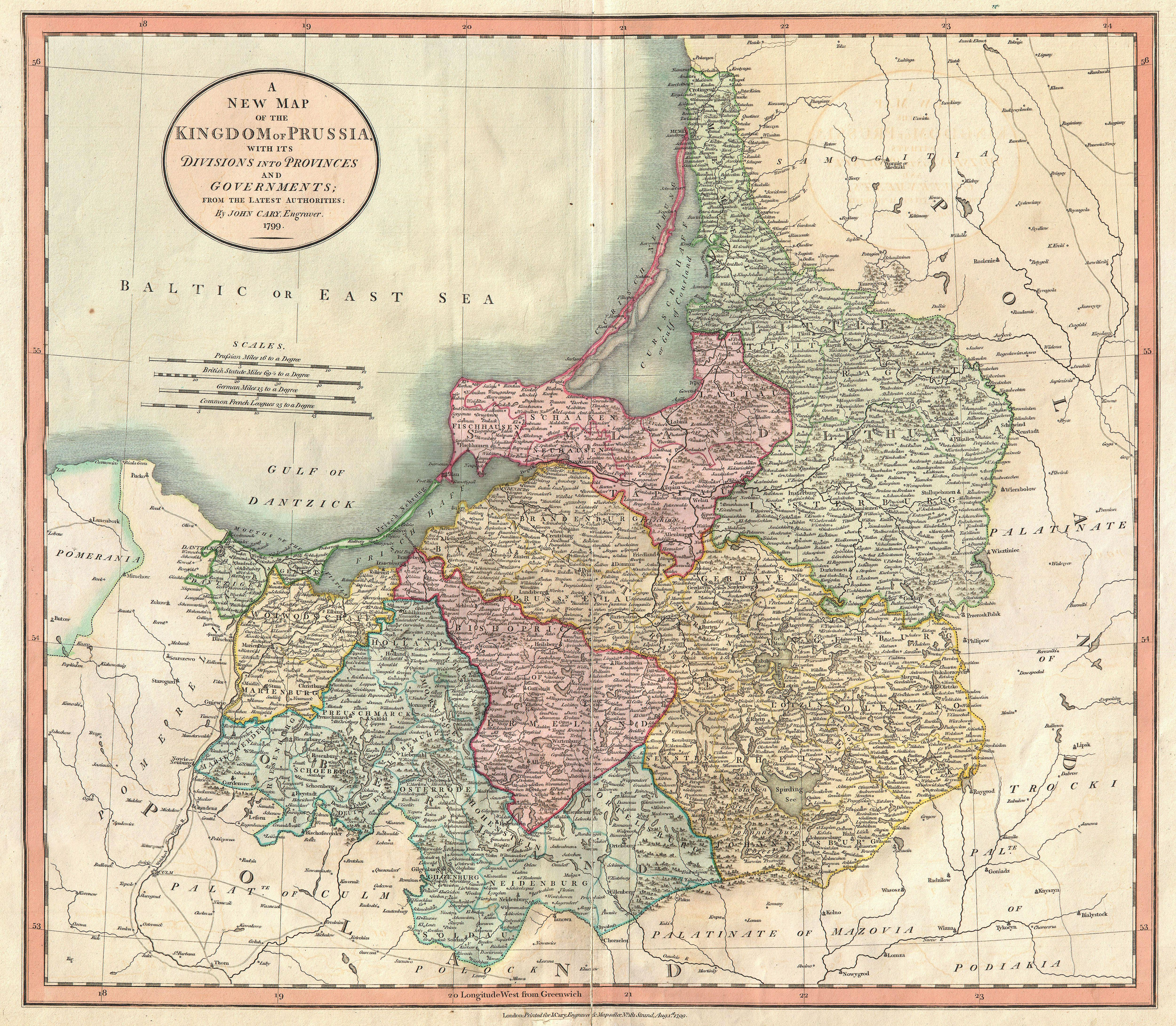
A New Map of the Kingdom of Prussia ... (1799) by John Cary

The Russo-Prussian alliance signed by the Kingdom of Prussia and the Russian Empire on 11 April 1764. It was pivotal to the people of Prussia and Russia, and it followed the end of the Seven Years' War. The alliance agreement expanded on the Treaty of Saint Petersburg of 1762, which ended the war between those two countries.

It was a defensive alliance, in which each party declared it would protect the territorial stability of the other. It further allowed both countries to intervene in the Polish–Lithuanian Commonwealth, which was one of the primary intentions of the treaty.

The treaty also allowed Prussia and Russia to exercise better control over the Polish–Lithuanian Commonwealth; both parties agreed to prevent the election of a third king from the House of Wettin. The two countries thus worked together to ensure the election of their own candidate, Stanisław August Poniatowski, later that year.

The treaty also included a provision allowing the signatories to intervene in Poland in case of an unapproved regime change. In fact, the two powers, together with Austria, would intervene jointly in Poland following the War of the Bar Confederation, resulting in the First Partition of Poland in 1772.

== Genesis and intention ==
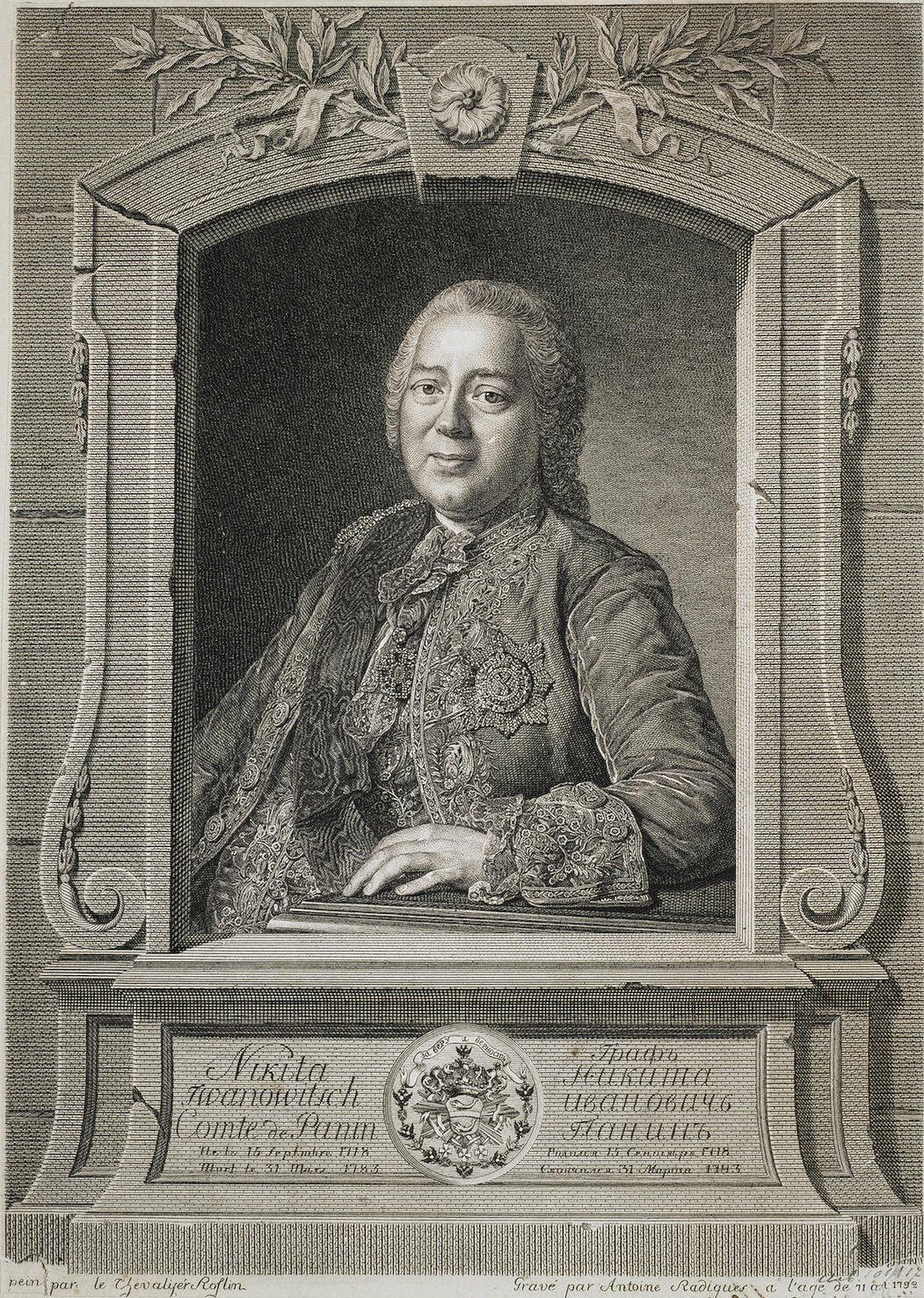
A 1792 engraving by Antoine Radigues of Nikita Panin, the creator of the treaty establishing the Russo-Prussian alliance

The treaty was a creation of the Russian diplomat Nikita Panin. It expanded on the Treaty of Saint Petersburg of 1762, which ended the fighting in the Seven Years' War between Prussia and Russia. Signed on 11 April 1764, it laid the foundation for the "northern system" in Russian politics in which Russia and Prussia were allied with Great Britain. Although the Anglo-Prussian Alliance had waned around that time, the ties between Great Britain and Russia strengthened, with a trade alliance signed in 1766.

The alliance was defensive in nature, each party declaring it would protect the territorial stability of the other. This provided Prussia with important security on the international scene by turning its most dangerous enemy into an ally. The alliance was also aimed at counteracting the power of the Habsburgs. From Russia's perspective, Austria had been less willing to compromise on issues related to the expanding Russian sphere of influence and was thus less attractive as an ally at that time. According to some historians, Russia would become the dominating partner in the alliance, partially fulfilling one of its goals from the Seven Years' War: increased influence over Prussia. Others have taken the view that the treaty was a skillful victory for Prussia despite the tendency of Russia to treat Prussia as a junior partner. Shortly before his death in 1786, Frederick the Great of Prussia declared that it was the most advantageous treaty he had made.

== Dissolution and aftermath ==
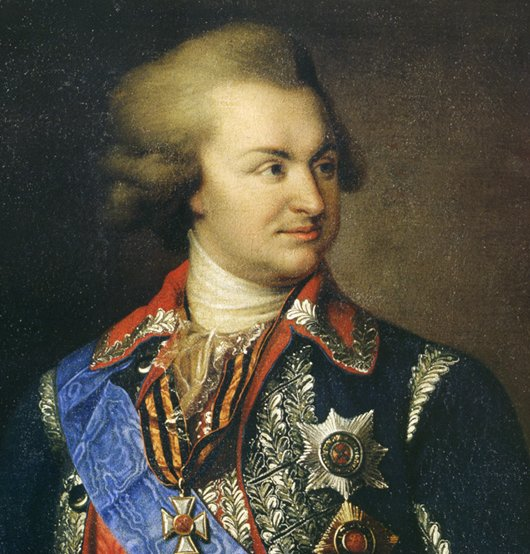
Detail of an 1847 portrait of Grigory Potemkin, who advocated closer ties between Russia and Austria

However, over the next few decades, Russia's attention was increasingly drawn towards the south and the Ottoman Empire. Advocated by Grigory Potemkin, this new direction reduced the strategic value of Prussia as an ally to Russia, and made Austria once again a more appealing candidate. The Russo-Prussian alliance was again extended in 1777, but at the imperial court in Saint Petersburg the influence of Panin's pro-Prussian faction was eclipsed by Potemkin's pro-Austrian one. After the death of Maria Theresa of Austria, Joseph II of Austria favored improving relations with Russia, and secret negotiations began in early 1781, resulting in an Austro-Russian alliance formed around May and June 1781. The Russo-Prussian alliance existed formally until 1788, but it lost most of its significance upon the declaration of the Austro-Russian alliance, which isolated Prussia on the international scene. Prussia would hence seek a new alliance with Great Britain. The end of this alliance also marked the downfall of Panin, who once said that his own political survival was tied to this treaty.

== See also ==
- Habsburgs-Savoyards alliance
- Bourbon-Hohenzollern pact
- Treaty of the Three Black Eagles
