= Swedish–Algerian war of 1791–1792 =

Military conflict

Swedish–Algerian war
Date	1791–1792
Location	Mediterranean Sea
Result	Inconclusive

Belligerents
Regency of Algiers	Sweden

Commanders and leaders
Sidi Hassan	(Sweden) Gustav III

Strength
Unknown	Unknown

Casualties and losses
Unknown	Unknown

The Swedish–Algerian war of 1791–1792 was a brief and inconclusive conflict between Sweden and the Regency of Algiers.

The conflict started in 1791 when Gustav III, King of Sweden, sent a gift to Sidi Hassan, Dey of Algiers. The Dey thought the gift unsatisfactory and felt disrespected. As a result, he expelled the Swedish consul, Mathias Skjöldebrand. Because of these actions, on August 15, the dey declared war on Sweden, in 1791. The reason for this escalation is unknown, but it is possible that the dey was trying to extort money from the Swedes.

After the declaration of war in 1791, Sweden opened diplomatic discussions with Algiers. Swiftly recognizing the need to secure a peaceful resolution, the Swedes demonstrated their commitment by willingly consenting to transfer a substantial sum of 350,000 francs to the dey. This diplomatic accord also included the provision of an annual tribute of 175,000 rixdollars, cementing their commitment to maintain amicable relations with Algiers.

The Swedish-Algerian War of 1791 had a relatively minor impact on both countries, they fought no major battles and the war ended quickly. Nine years after that war, Sweden declared war on Ottoman Tripolitania (known as the First Barbary War), but instead of engaging in combat, Sweden decided to increase the amount of its tribute to the Barbary States, as this was cheaper than to wage war.
