= Anglo-Prussian Alliance (1788) =

Military alliance between Great Britain and Prussia

The Anglo-Prussian Alliance was a military alliance between Great Britain and Prussia signed on 13 August 1788 in response to the Austro-Russian alliance. Its aim was to limit the expansion of Austria and Russia at the cost of the Ottoman Empire in the context of the Austro-Turkish War (1788–1791) and the Russo-Turkish War (1787–1792).

== Genesis ==
Prussia and Great Britain were concerned that Austria and Russia, having acquired new territories in the Black Sea region, would threaten the European balance of power. In the United Kingdom, this policy was advocated by William Pitt the Younger and supported by the British ambassador in Russia, Charles Whitworth, and British ambassador to Prussia, Joseph Ewart. Pitt was also concerned with a deficit in foreign trade with Russia, which Britain had, and intended to reduce it by increasing import to other countries in the region (such as the Polish–Lithuanian Commonwealth), and shifting the exports from Russia to those countries as well. Great Britain did not want war, in so much as it would be content if Russia would retreat from its war with the Ottomans without any territorial changes, but it realized this was an unlikely outcome.

== Triple Alliance ==
Earlier in 1788, in April, Prussia also secured a credit in case of a war with Russia from the Netherlands. The Anglo-Prusso-Netherland coalition became known as the Triple Alliance.

== See also ==
- Anglo-Prussian Alliance (1756)
