= Crown distillery =

Swedish distilleries

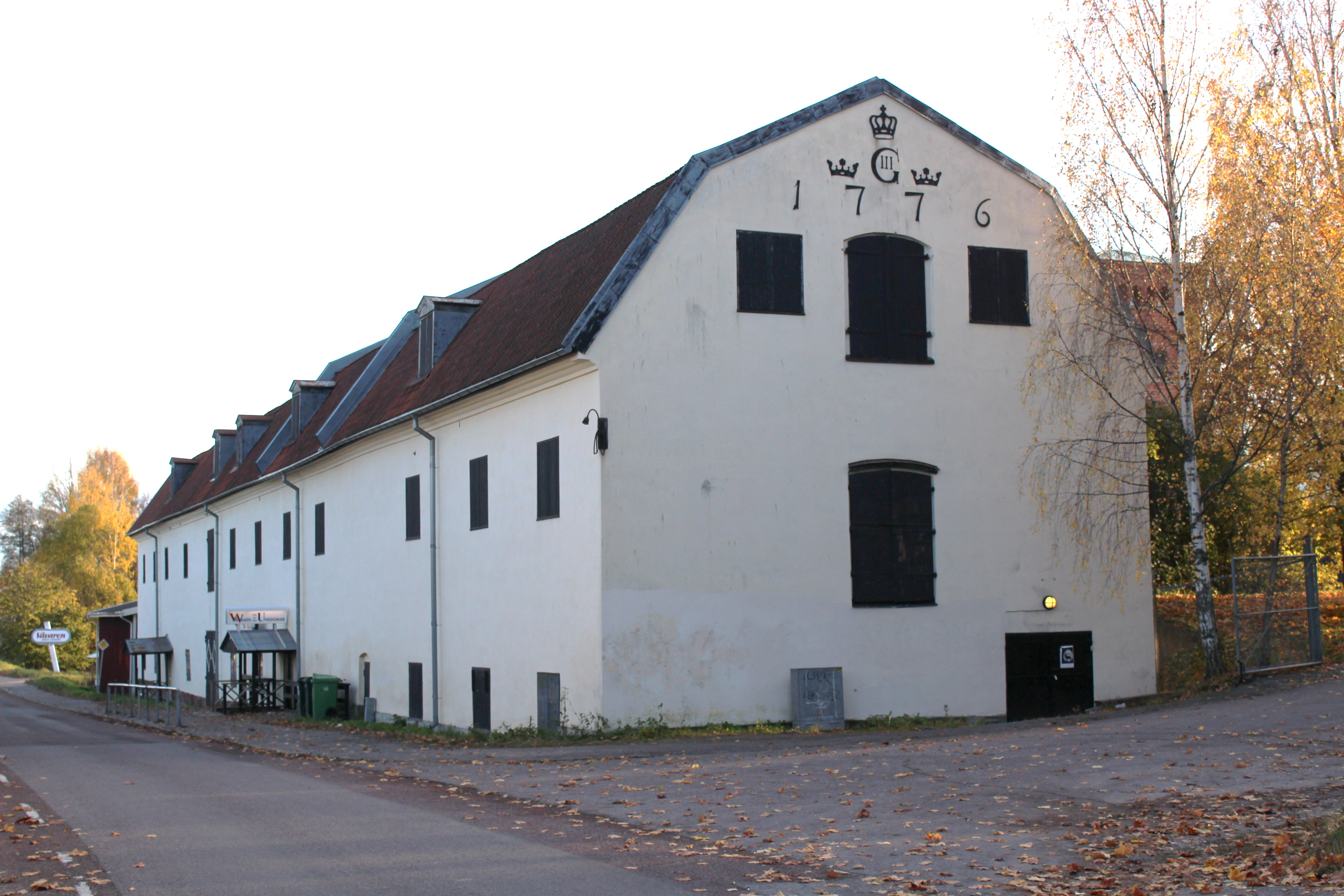
The Crown Distillery at Strömsbro, Gävle, 2013

A crown distillery (Swedish: Kronobränneri) was one of the state-operated distilleries in Sweden between 1775 and 1824.

== Establishment ==
The network of crown distilleries was established in 1775, when King Gustav III, acting on the advice of his finance minister Johan Liljencrantz, declared a state monopoly over the production and sale of alcoholic spirits, with the twofold goal of raising extra revenues for the state while also reducing alcohol consumption and its accompanying health and social problems. It therefore became illegal to obtain spirits by any means other than from the new Crown Distilleries, and as such the importation of spirits from abroad was banned, as was the distillation of spirits by private individuals.

== Distilleries ==
Some 50-60 Crown Distilleries were established across the kingdom, including the following:

- Gripsholm Distillery
- Halmstad Crown Distillery
- Katarina Crown Distillery, Södermalm (Stockholm)
- Strömsbro Crown Distillery, Gävle
- Tanto Crown Distillery, Södermalm (Stockholm)

== Closure ==
The state monopoly was hugely unpopular, especially among the common people, as it banned the longstanding Swedish tradition of husbehovsbränning (roughly translatable as 'distillation for household needs'), though many people flouted the restrictions and continued to distil spirits illegally (Swedish: lönnbränning). Moreover, the Crown Distilleries themselves failed to turn a profit. Gustav III was therefore forced to lift the monopoly at the 1786 session of the Riksdag (the Swedish parliament), and most of the Crown Distilleries were shut down over the next couple of years. However, a few of the more profitable ones remained in operation for some time thereafter, and the last did not close until as late as 1824.

== See also ==
- Gustav III of Sweden
- Systembolaget
