= Austro-Russian Alliance (1781) =

Military alliance between Austria and Russia

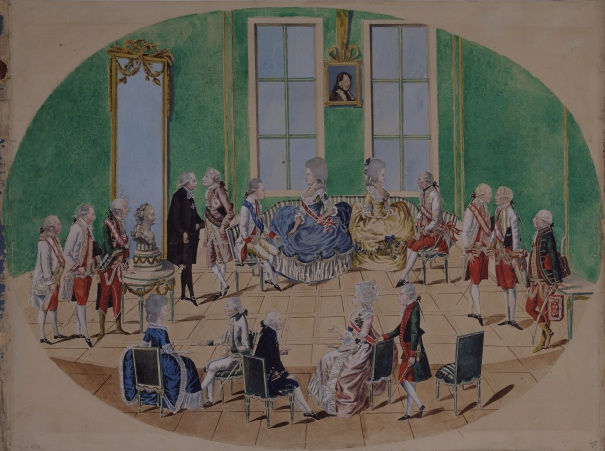
A painting of Grand Duke Pavel Petrovich and Grand Duchess Maria Fyodorovna in Vienna in 1782

Austro-Russian Alliance refers to the treaty of military alliance signed by the Habsburg monarchy and the Russian Empire in May–June 1781. Russia was previously allied with Prussia (Russo-Prussian Alliance). However, with time, Russia's attention was increasingly drawn towards the south, and the Ottoman Empire. Advocated by Grigory Potemkin, the new direction reduced the strategic value of Prussia as an ally to Russia and made Austria once again a more appealing candidate. The Russo-Prussian Alliance was once again extended in 1777, but at the imperial court in Saint Petersburg, Nikita Ivanovich Panin's pro-Prussian faction had its influence eclipsed by the Potemkin's pro-Austrian faction.

After the death of Maria Theresa of Austria, Joseph II of Austria wanted to improve relations with Russia, and secret negotiations begun in early 1781 and resulted in an Austro-Russian alliance being formed around May and June 1781. The Russo-Prussian alliance existed formally until 1788 but lost most of its significance upon the declaration of the Austro-Russian alliance, which isolated Prussia on the international scene. The most notable consequences of the Austro-Russian alliance were the Austro-Turkish War (1788–1791) and the Russo-Turkish War (1787–1792). In 1790, the alliance was strained since Russia informed Austria that it has no desire to interfere in a possible conflict erupting between Austria and Prussia.

== Sources ==
- Bronza, Boro (2010). "The Habsburg Monarchy and the Projects for Division of the Ottoman Balkans, 1771-1788". Empires and Peninsulas: Southeastern Europe between Karlowitz and the Peace of Adrianople, 1699–1829. Berlin: LIT Verlag. pp. 51–62. ISBN 9783643106117.
- De Madariaga, Isabel. "The secret Austro-Russian treaty of 1781." Slavonic and East European Review 38.90 (1959): 114–145. online
- Mayer, Matthew Z. "The Price for Austria's Security: Part I—Joseph II, the Russian Alliance, and the Ottoman War, 1787–1789." International History Review 26.2 (2004): 257–299. online
