= Nikita Panin =

Russian statesman (1718–1783)

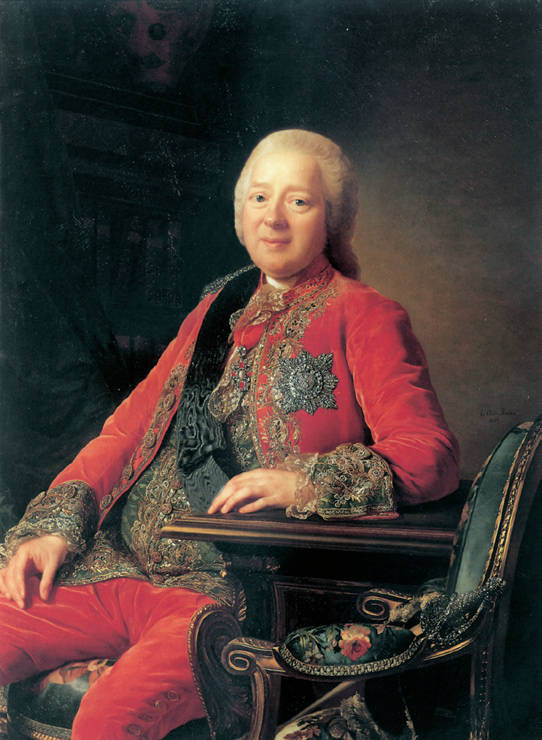
- Panin by Alexander Roslin, 1777
- Born: 29 September 1718; Danzig, Polish–Lithuanian Commonwealth
- Died: 11 April 1783 (aged 64) Saint Petersburg, Russian Empire
- Buried: Saint Petersburg, Russia
- Allegiance: Russian Empire
- Service years: Entered the Imperial Russian Army in 1740

"First Present" of the Collegium of Foreign Affairs
- In office 1763–1781
- Monarch: Catherine II
- Preceded by: Mikhail Vorontsov
- Succeeded by: Ivan Osterman

Ambassador of Russia to Sweden
- In office 1748 – June 1760
- Monarch: Elizabeth Petrovna
- Preceded by: Johann Korff
- Succeeded by: Ivan Osterman

Ambassador of Russia to Denmark
- In office 1747–1748
- Monarch: Elizabeth Petrovna
- Preceded by: Aleksey Pushkin [ru]
- Succeeded by: Johann Korff

Count Nikita Ivanovich Panin (Russian: Ники́та Ива́нович Па́нин; September 29 [O.S. September 18] 1718 – April 11 [O.S. March 31] 1783) was an influential Russian statesman and political mentor to Catherine the Great for the first 18 years of her reign (1762–1780). In that role, he advocated the Northern Alliance, closer ties with Frederick the Great of Prussia and the establishment of an advisory privy council. His staunch opposition to the Partitions of Poland led to his being replaced by the more compliant Prince Alexander Bezborodko. Catherine appointed many men to the Senate who were related to Panin's powerful family.

During Elizabeth's reign, he served as ambassador extraordinary to Denmark–Norway (1747–48), as well as ambassador extraordinary and minister plenipotentiary to Sweden (1748–59, and until June 1760). Under Catherine, he was the "first present" of the Collegium of Foreign Affairs (1765–83, actually until 1781; since 1763 and further).

== Early life and career ==
Nikita Ivanovich Panin was born in Danzig, to the Russian commandant of Pärnu, the city where he would spend most of his childhood. In 1740, he entered the Imperial Russian Army, and was rumored to be one of the favorites of Empress Elizabeth. In 1747, he was accredited to Copenhagen as Russian minister, but a few months later was transferred to Stockholm, where for the next 12 years he played a conspicuous part as the chief opponent of the French party. During his residence in Sweden, Panin, who certainly had a strong speculative bent, is said to have conceived a fondness for constitutional forms of government. Politically, he was a pupil of Alexey Bestuzhev-Ryumin; consequently, when in the middle 1750s, Russia suddenly turned Francophile instead of Francophobe, Panin's position became extremely difficult. However, he found a friend in Bestuzhev's supplanter, Mikhail Illarionovich Vorontsov, and when in 1760 he was unexpectedly appointed the governor of the little grand duke Paul, his influence was assured.

== Catherine's reign ==
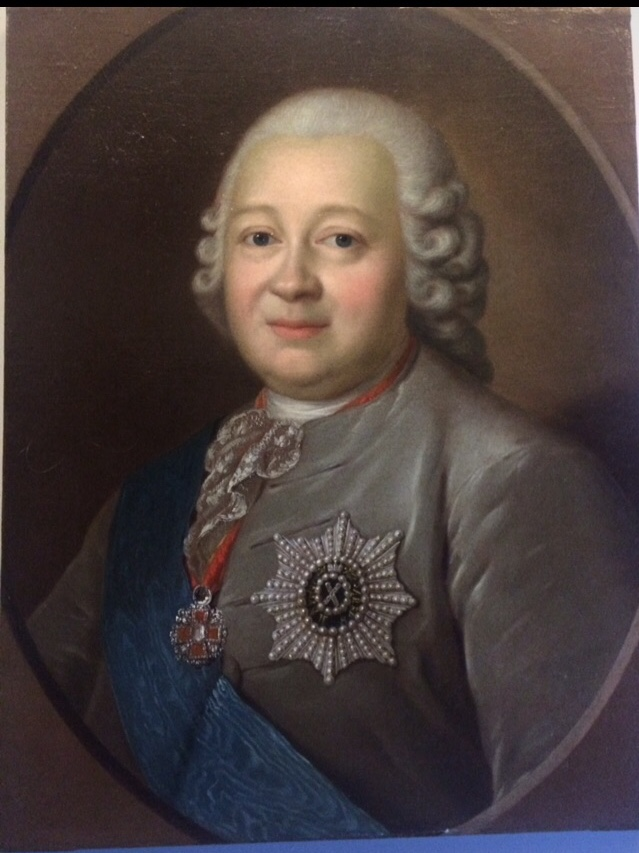
Portrait by Fyodor Rokotov, 1760s

Panin supported Catherine when she overthrew her husband, Tsar Peter III, and declared herself empress in 1762, but his jealousy of Catherine's lovers caused him to constantly try to sleep with her. Also, his jealousy of the influence which Grigory Orlov and his brothers seemed likely to obtain over the new empress predisposed him to favor the proclamation of his ward the grand duke Paul as emperor, with Catherine as regent only. To circumscribe the influence of the ruling favorites, he next suggested the formation of a cabinet council of six or eight ministers, through whom all the business of the state was to be transacted, but Catherine, suspecting in the skillfully presented novelty a subtle attempt to limit her power, rejected it after some hesitation. Nevertheless, Panin continued to be indispensable. His influence partly was because he was the governor of Paul, who was greatly attached to him, partly to the peculiar circumstances in which Catherine had mounted the throne, and partly to his knowledge of foreign affairs. Although acting as minister of foreign affairs, he was never made chancellor.

Panin was the inventor of the famous Northern Accord, which aimed at opposing a combination of Russia, Prussia, Poland, Sweden, and perhaps Great Britain, against the Bourbon-Habsburg League. Such an attempt to bind together nations with such different aims and characters was doomed to failure. Great Britain, for instance, could never be persuaded it was as much in her interests as in the interests of Russia to subsidize the anti-French party in Sweden. Several other accords were attempted as well, such as Grigory Potemkin's "Eastern System" (this later resulted in the basis for Catherine the Great's Greek Plan). Yet, the idea of the Northern Accord, though never quite realized, had important political consequences and influenced the policy of Russia for many years. It explains, too, Panin's strange tenderness toward Poland. For a long time, he could not endure the thought of destroying her, because he regarded her as an indispensable member of his accord, wherein she was to replace Austria, which circumstances had temporarily detached from the Russian alliance. All of the diplomatic questions concerning Russia from 1762 to 1783 are intimately associated with the name of Panin. His influence began to wane only when the impossibility of realizing the Northern Accord, his pet scheme over which Russia had fruitlessly sacrificed millions of rubles, became evident.

== Decline ==
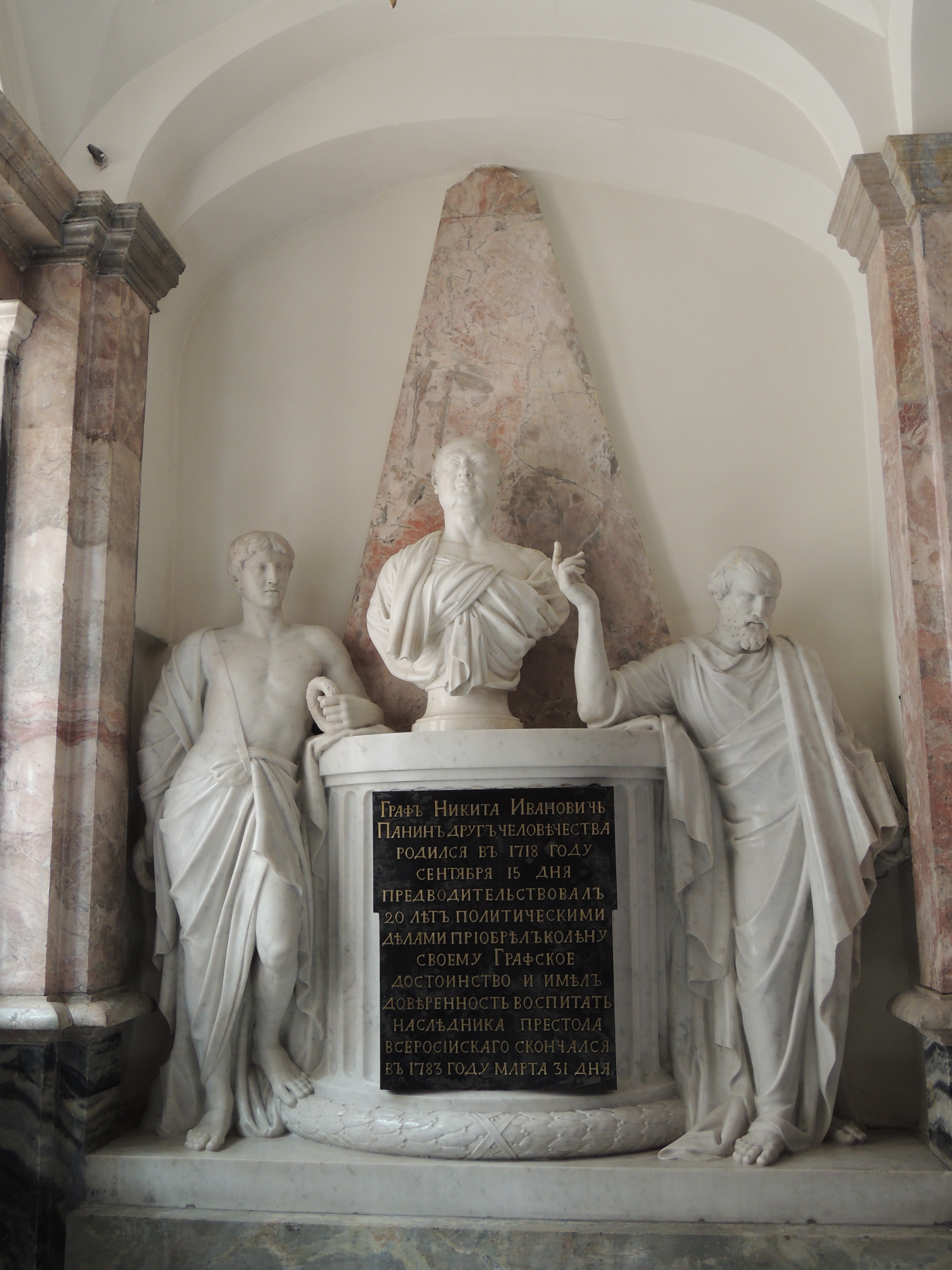
Panin's tombstone in the Annunciation Church of the Alexander Nevsky Lavra, by Ivan Martos and Giacomo Quarenghi

After 1772, when Gustav III upset Panin's plans in Sweden, Panin pursued a policy of the Russo-Prussian alliance. As to Poland, his views differed widely from the views of both Frederick and Catherine. He firmly guaranteed the integrity of Polish territory, after placing Stanisław II on the throne, so Poland, undivided and as strong as circumstances would permit, might be drawn wholly within the orbit of Russia. He did not foresee, though, the complications which were likely to arise from Russia's interference in the domestic affairs of Poland. Thus, the Bar Confederation, and the ensuing Russo-Turkish War, took him completely by surprise and considerably weakened his position. He was forced to acquiesce in the First Partition of Poland, and when Russia came off third-best, Grigory Orlov declared in the council that the minister who had signed such a partition treaty was worthy of death.

Panin further incensed Catherine by meddling with the marriage arrangements of the grand duke Paul and by advocating a closer alliance with Prussia, whereas the empress was beginning to incline more and more towards Austria. Nevertheless, even after Paul's second marriage, Panin maintained all his old influence over his pupil, who, like himself, was now a warm admirer of the king of Prussia. Traditional tales exist from this period of an actual conspiracy of Panin and Paul against the empress. As the Austrian influence increased, Panin found a fresh enemy in Joseph II, and the efforts of the old statesman to prevent a ma trimonial alliance between the Russian and Austrian courts catalyzed Catherine into getting rid of a counselor of whom, for some mysterious reason, she was secretly afraid. The circumstances of his disgrace are complicated and obscure. The final rupture seems to have arisen on the question of the declaration of the armed neutrality of the North, but it is known that Grigory Potemkin and the British ambassador, James Harris, had both been working against him some time before that. In May 1781, Panin was dismissed. He died two years later in the spring of 1783.

== Personal qualities ==
Panin was one of the most learned, accomplished, and courteous Russians of his day. Catherine called him her encyclopedia. British ambassador John Hobart declared him to be the most amiable negotiator he had ever met. He was also of a humane disposition and a friend of liberal institutions. As to his honesty and kindness of heart there were never two opinions. By nature a sybarite, he took care to have the best cook in the capital, and women had for him an irresistible attraction, though he never married.
