= Southern Netherlands =

Historical region in Belgium

The Southern Netherlands, (Note: Dutch: Zuidelijke Nederlanden; Spanish: Países Bajos del Sur; French: Pays-Bas méridionaux.) also called the Catholic Netherlands, were the parts of the Low Countries belonging to the Holy Roman Empire which were at first largely controlled by Habsburg Spain (Spanish Netherlands, 1556–1714) and later by the Austrian Habsburgs (Austrian Netherlands, 1714–1794) until occupied and annexed by Revolutionary France (1794–1815).

The region also included a number of smaller states that were never ruled by Spain or Austria: the Prince-Bishopric of Liège, the Imperial Abbey of Stavelot-Malmedy, the County of Bouillon, the County of Horne and the Princely Abbey of Thorn.

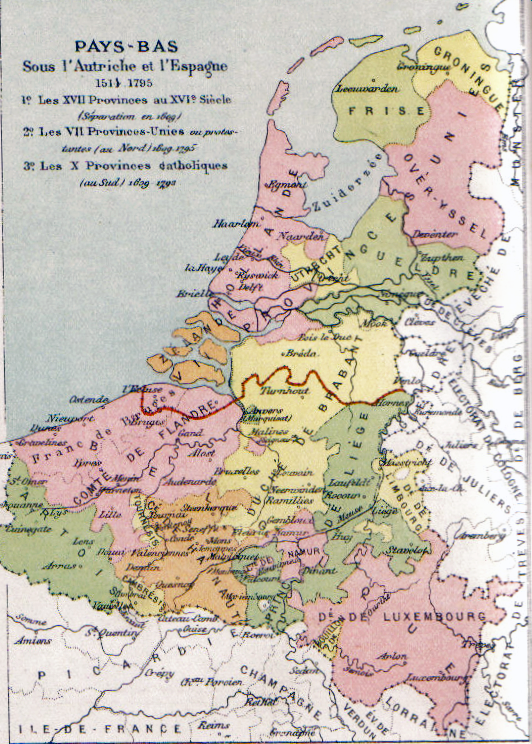
The (Habsburgs') Low Countries (c. 1515 –1715; including Liège, Stavelot-Malmedy and Bouillon), the border between the Northern Netherlands and the Southern Netherlands is marked in red.
(Note that Upper Guelders (south of the main area of Guelders in Netherlands, and east of the Duchy of Brabant, in light yellow) was mistakenly left white on this map)

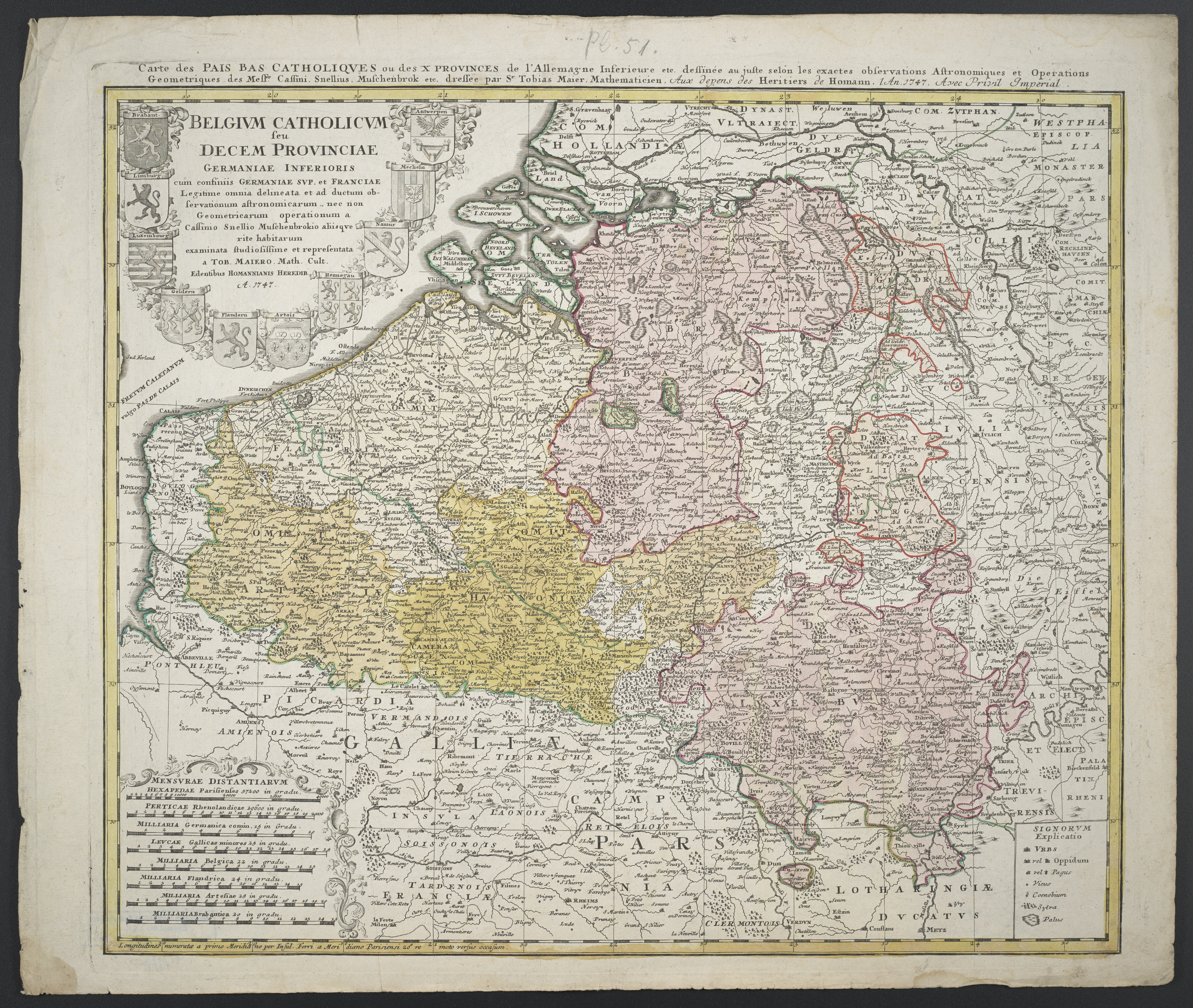
"Catholic Belgium" (Tobias Mayer, 1747); including United Provinces–controlled Generality Lands and territories which fell to the Kingdom of France in 1659–1678 while excluding the Prince-Bishopric of Liège.

The Southern Netherlands comprised most of modern-day Belgium and Luxembourg, small parts of the modern Netherlands and Germany (the Upper Guelders region, as well as the Bitburg area in Germany, then part of Luxembourg), in addition to (until 1678) most of the present Nord-Pas-de-Calais region, and Longwy area in northern France. The (southern) Upper Guelders region consisted of what is now divided between Germany and the modern Dutch Province of Limburg (in 1713 largely ceded to Prussia).

== Place in the broader Netherlands ==
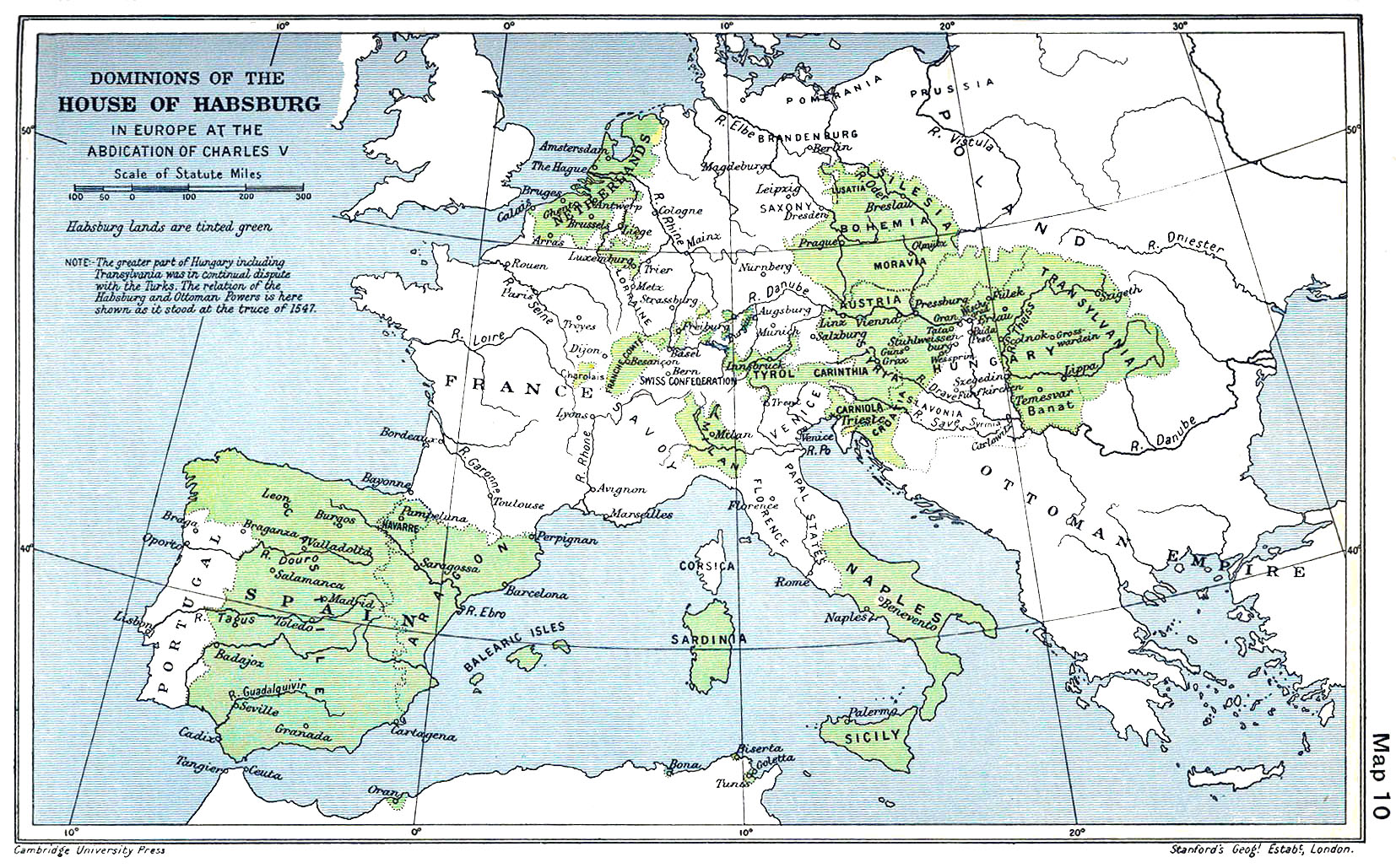
A map of the dominion of the Habsburgs following the Battle of Mühlberg (1547) as depicted in The Cambridge Modern History Atlas (1912); Habsburg lands are shaded green. From 1556 the dynasty's lands in the Low Countries, the east of France, Italy, Sardinia, and Sicily were retained by the Spanish Habsburgs.

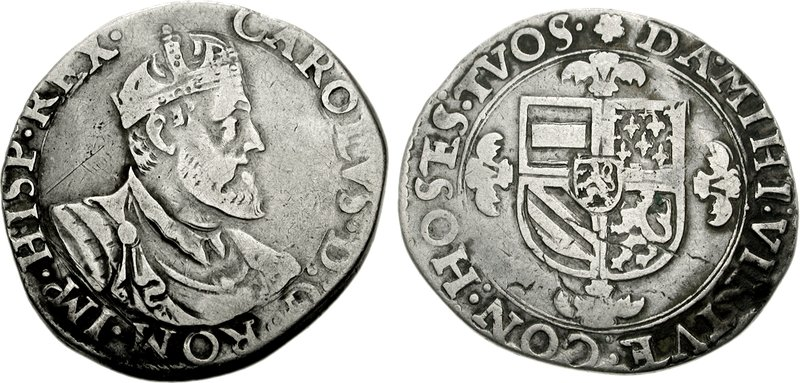
Silver florin of Emperor Charles V with the coat of arms of the House of Burgundy (Low Countries, etc.) c. 1553.

As they were very wealthy, the Netherlands in general were an important territory of the Habsburg crown which also ruled Spain and Austria among other places. But unlike the other Habsburg dominions, they were led by a merchant class. It was the merchant economy which made them wealthy, and the Habsburg attempts at increasing taxation to finance their wars (Note: The example of these expensive wars which is best known to English-speaking people is that of the Spanish Armada. However, that came in 1588, a little after the Dutch had become exasperated to the extent of signing the Union of Utrecht in 1579.) was a major factor in the population's (merchants') efforts to defend their privileges. This, added to resistance to penal laws enforced by the Habsburg monarchy that made heresy a capital crime, led to a general rebellion of the Netherlands against Habsburg rule towards 1570 (protests and hostilities started the Eighty Years' War c. 1566–1568). Although the northern seven provinces, led by Holland and Zeeland, established their independence as the United Provinces after 1581, the ten southern Netherlands were reconquered by the Spanish general Alexander Farnese, Duke of Parma. Liège, Stavelot-Malmédy and Bouillon maintained their independence.

The Habsburg Netherlands passed to the Austrian Habsburgs after the War of the Spanish Succession in 1714. Under Austrian rule, the ten provinces' defence of their privileges proved as troublesome to the reforming Emperor Joseph II, Holy Roman Emperor as it had to his ancestor Philip II two centuries earlier, leading to a major rebellion in 1789–1790. The Austrian Netherlands were ultimately lost to the French Revolutionary armies, and annexed to France in 1794. Following the war, Austria's loss of the territories was confirmed, and they were joined with the northern Netherlands as a single kingdom under the House of Orange at the 1815 Congress of Vienna. The southeastern third of Luxembourg Province was made into the autonomous Grand Duchy of Luxembourg, because it was claimed by both the Netherlands and Prussia.

In 1830 the predominantly Roman Catholic southern half became independent as the Kingdom of Belgium (the northern half being predominantly Calvinist. In 1839 the final border between the kingdom of the Netherlands and Belgium was determined and the eastern part of Limburg went to the Netherlands as the province of Limburg. The autonomy of Luxembourg was recognised in 1839, but an instrument to that effect was not signed until 1867. The King of the Netherlands was Grand Duke of Luxembourg until 1890, when William III was succeeded by his daughter, Wilhelmina of the Netherlands – but Luxembourg still followed the Salic law at the time, which forbade a woman to rule in her own right; so the union of the Dutch and Luxembourgish crowns then ended. The northwestern two-thirds of the original Luxembourg remains a province of Belgium.

== Spanish Netherlands ==
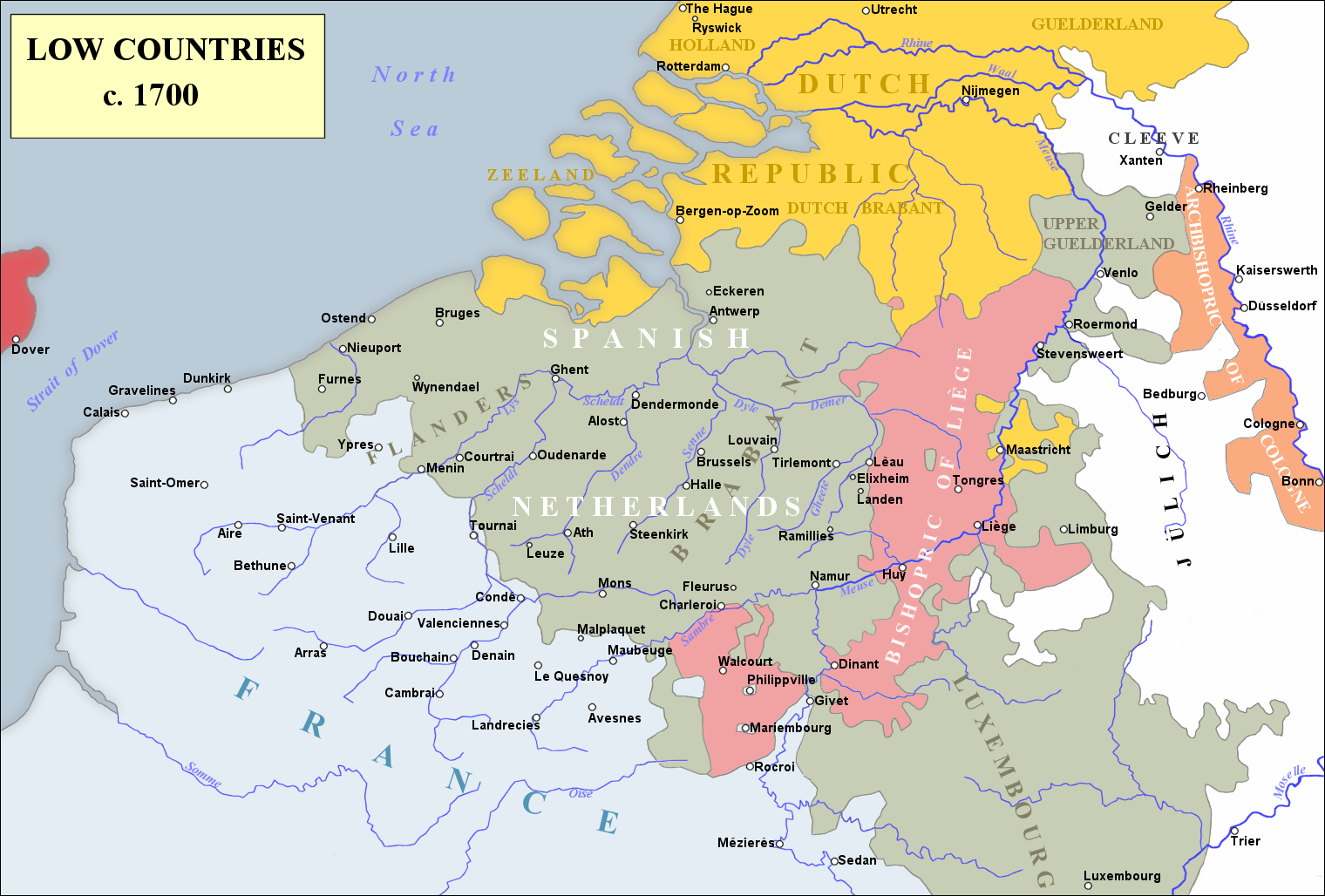
Spanish Low Countries c. 1700 (grey/green)

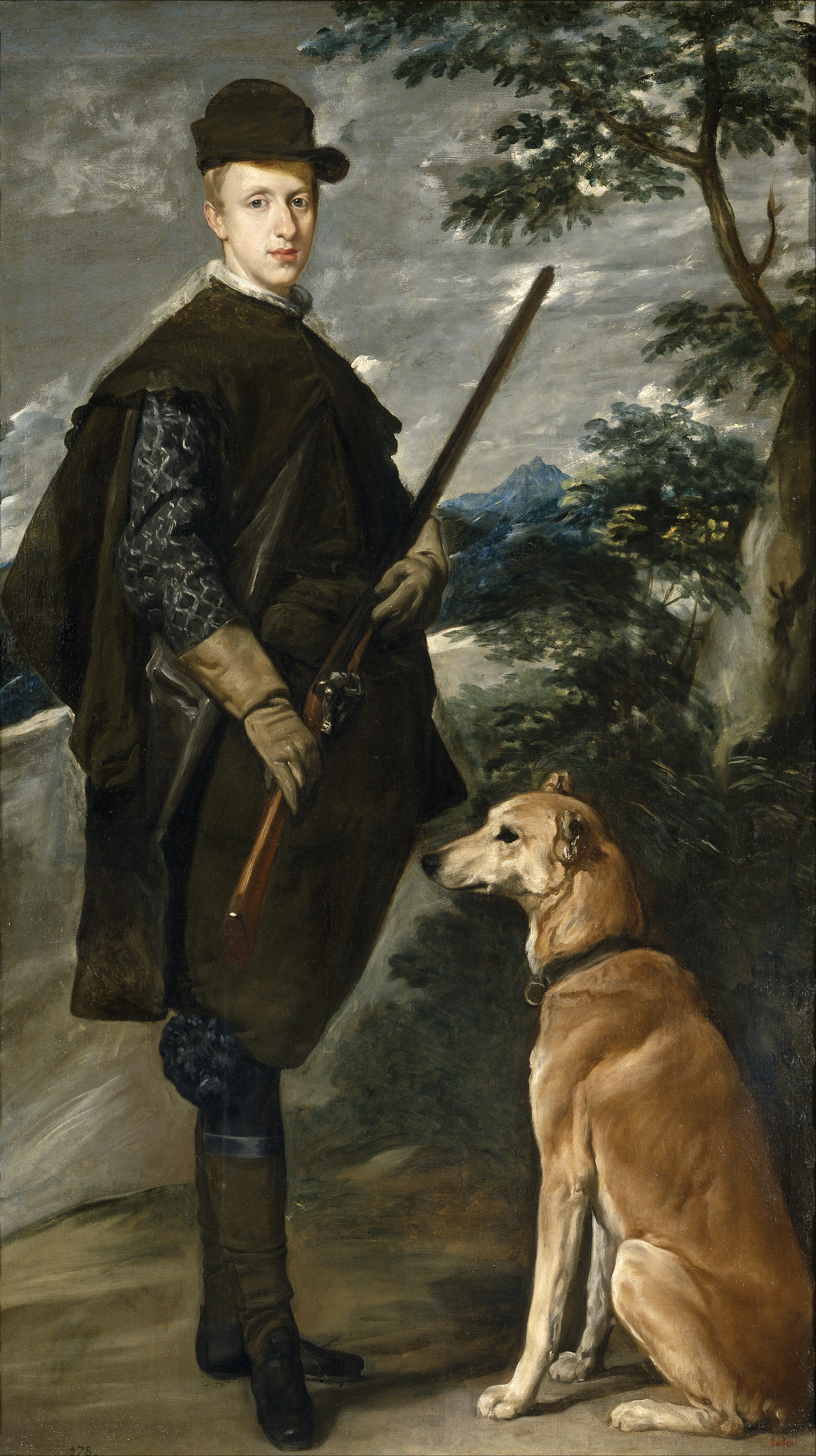
Velázquez portrait of the Cardinal-Infante Ferdinand, son of Philip III of Spain, Governor General of the Low Countries at age 25, in 1634, until his death in 1641.

The Spanish Netherlands (Dutch: Spaanse Nederlanden, Spanish: Países Bajos españoles) was a portion of the Low Countries controlled by Spain from 1556 to 1714, inherited from the Dukes of Burgundy. Although the territory of the Duchy of Burgundy itself remained in the hands of France, the Habsburgs remained in control of the title of Duke of Burgundy and the other parts of the Burgundian inheritance, notably the Low Countries and the Free County of Burgundy in the Holy Roman Empire. They often used the term Burgundy to refer to it (e.g. in the name of the Imperial Circle it was grouped into), until 1794, when the Austrian Netherlands were lost to the French Republic.

When part of the Netherlands separated from Spanish rule and became the United Provinces in 1581 the remainder of the area became known as the Spanish Netherlands and remained under Spanish control. This region comprised modern Belgium, Luxembourg as well as part of northern France.

The Spanish Netherlands originally consisted of:

- County of Flanders, including Walloon Flanders
- County of Artois
- City of Tournai
- Cambrai (roughly the département Nord and the northern half of Pas-de-Calais in modern France)
- Duchy of Luxembourg
- Duchy of Limburg
- County of Hainaut
- County of Namur
- Lordship of Mechelen (Note: A seignory comes closest to the concept of a heerlijkheid; there is no equivalent in English for the Dutch-language term. In its earliest history, Mechelen was a heerlijkheid of the Bishopric (later Prince-Bishopric) of Liège that exercised its rights through the Chapter of Saint Rumbold though at the same time the Lords of Berthout and later the Dukes of Brabant also exercised or claimed separate feudal rights.) (officially a county since 1490)
- Duchy of Brabant, including the Margraviate of Antwerp
- the Upper Quarter (Bovenkwartier) of the duchy of Guelders (around Venlo and Roermond, in the present province of Dutch Limburg, and the town of Geldern in the present German district Kleve)

The capital, Brussels, was in Brabant. In the early 17th century, there was a flourishing court at Brussels, which was under the government of King Philip III's half-sister Archduchess Isabella and her husband, Archduke Albert of Austria. Among the artists who emerged from the court of the "Archdukes", as they were known, was Peter Paul Rubens. Under the Archdukes, the Spanish Netherlands actually had formal independence from Spain, but always remained unofficially within the Spanish sphere of influence, and with Albert's death in 1621 they returned to formal Spanish control, although the childless Isabella remained on as Governor until her death in 1633.

The failing wars intended to regain the 'heretical' northern Netherlands meant significant loss of (still mainly Catholic) territories in the north, which was consolidated in 1648 in the Peace of Westphalia, and given the peculiar, inferior status of Generality Lands (jointly ruled by the United Republic, not admitted as member provinces): Zeelandic Flanders (south of the river Scheldt), the present Dutch province of North Brabant and Maastricht (in the present Dutch province of Limburg).

As Spanish power waned in the latter decades of the 17th century, the territory of the Spanish Netherlands was repeatedly invaded by the French and an increasing portion of the territory came under French control in successive wars. By the Treaty of the Pyrenees of 1659 the French annexed Artois while Dunkirk was ceded to the English. By the Treaties of Aix-la-Chapelle (ending the War of Devolution in 1668) and Nijmegen (ending the Franco-Dutch War in 1678), further territory up to the current Franco-Belgian border was ceded, including Cambrai, Walloon Flanders (the area around Lille, Douai and Orchies), as well as half of the county of Hainaut (including Valenciennes). Later, in the War of the Reunions and the Nine Years' War, France temporarily annexed other parts of the region that were returned in the 1697 Peace of Ryswick.

== Austrian Netherlands ==
The Austrian Netherlands were bisected by the fragmented Principality of Liège: historic Flanders, Brabant, Hainaut and Namur to the West, and Luxemburg to the east.

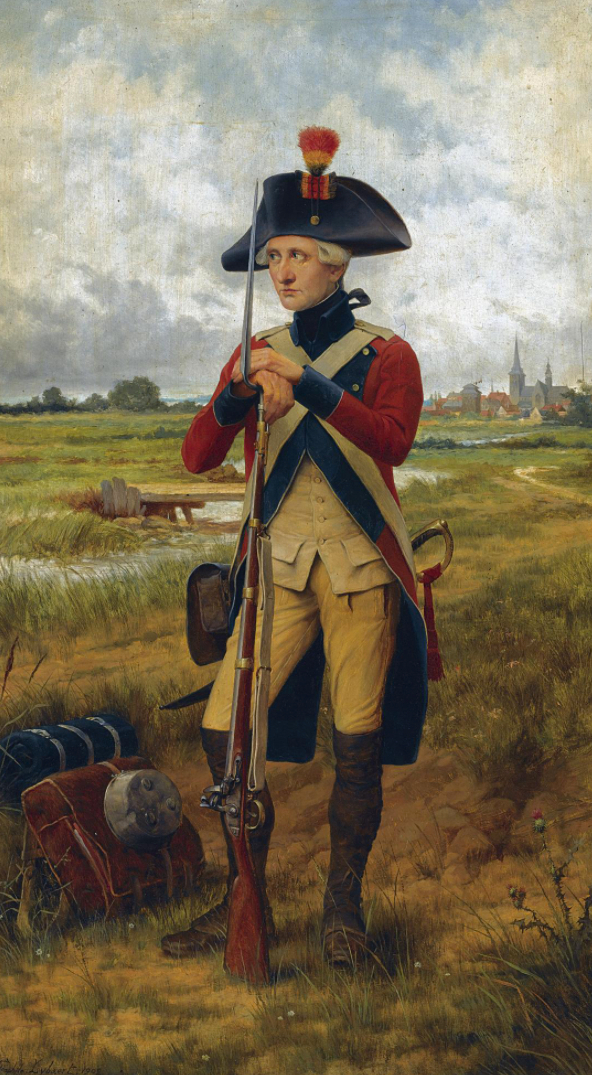
1902 painting of a Patriot soldier at the Battle of Turnhout

Under the Treaty of Rastatt (1714), following the War of the Spanish Succession, what was left of the Spanish Netherlands was ceded to Austria and thus became known as the Austrian Netherlands or Belgium Austriacum. However, the Austrians themselves generally had little interest in the region (aside from a short-lived attempt by Emperor Charles VI to compete with British and Dutch trade through the Ostend Company), and the fortresses along the border (the Barrier Fortresses) were, by treaty, garrisoned with Dutch troops. The area had, in fact, been given to Austria largely at British and Dutch insistence, as these powers feared potential French domination of the region.

Throughout the latter part of the eighteenth century, the principal foreign policy goal of the Habsburg rulers was to exchange the Austrian Netherlands for Bavaria, which would round out Habsburg possessions in southern Germany. In the 1757 Treaty of Versailles, Austria agreed to the creation of an independent state in the Southern Netherlands ruled by Philip, Duke of Parma and garrisoned by French troops in exchange for French help in recovering Silesia. However the agreement was unimplemented and revoked by the Third Treaty of Versailles (1785) and Austrian rule continued.

In 1784, its ruler, Emperor Joseph II, took up the long-standing grudge of Antwerp, whose once-flourishing trade was destroyed by the permanent closing of the Scheldt, and he demanded for the Dutch Republic to open the river to navigation. However, his stance was far from militant, and he called off hostilities after the so-called Kettle War, so called because its only "casualty" was a kettle. Though Joseph secured in the 1785 Treaty of Fontainebleau that the territory's rulers would be compensated by the Dutch Republic for the continued closing the Scheldt, this failed to gain him much popularity.

The people of the Austrian Netherlands rebelled against Austria in 1788 as a result of Joseph II's centralizing policies. The different provinces established the United States of Belgium (January 1790). However, waylaying Joseph's intended concessions to the Belgians to restore the height of their autonomy and privileges, Austrian imperial power had been restored by Joseph's brother and successor, Leopold II, by the end of 1790.

== French annexation ==
History of the Low Countries (schematic)
Frisii		Germanic tribes		Belgae & Celts			
Frisii	Cana– nefates (Note: Roman foederati)	Chamavi, Tubantes (Note: The Chamavi merged into the confederation of the Franks; the Tubantes merged into the confederation of the Saxons.)		Gallia Belgica (55 BC–c. 5th century AD); Germania Inferior (83–c. 5th century)			
Frisii	Cana– nefates	Salian Franks		Batavi			
unpopulated (4th –c. 5th centuries)		Saxons	Salian Franks (4th–c. 5th centuries)				
Frisian Kingdom (c. 6th century – 734)		Saxons	Frankish Kingdom (481–843)—Carolingian Empire (800–843)				
Frisian Kingdom (c. 6th century – 734)		Austrasia (511–687)					
Middle Francia (843–855)				West; Francia (from 843)	Middle Francia (843–855)		
Kingdom of Lotharingia (Note: Part of East Francia after 939, divided in Upper Lorraine (as part of West Francia) and Lower Lorraine (as part of East Francia) in 959.) (855–959); Duchy of Lower Lorraine (Note: Lower Lorraine—also referred to as Lothier—disintegrated into several smaller independent territories and only the title of a "Duke of Lothier" remained, held by Brabant.) (from 959)			Kingdom of Lotharingia (855–959); Duchy of Lower Lorraine (from 959)	West; Francia (from 843)	Kingdom of Lotharingia (855–959); Duchy of Lower Lorraine (from 959)		
Frisia			Kingdom of Lotharingia (855–959); Duchy of Lower Lorraine (from 959)	County of Flanders (Note: Including County of Artois (part of Flanders until 1237) and Tournaisis.) (862–1384)	Kingdom of Lotharingia (855–959); Duchy of Lower Lorraine (from 959)		
Frisian; Freedom (Note: Lordship of Frisia and Lordship of Groningen (including the Ommelanden) after 1524 and 1536 respectively.) (11th–16th centuries)	County of Holland (Note: Including County of Zeeland, that was ruled by neighboring County of Holland and County of Flanders (until 1432).) (880–1432)	Bishopric of Utrecht (Note: Utrecht included Lordship of Overijssel (until 1528), County of Drenthe (until 1528) and County of Zutphen (until 1182).) (695–1456)	Duchy of Brabant (Note: Duchy of Brabant included since 1288 also the Duchy of Limburg (now part of Belgium's Liège Province) and the "Overmaas" lands Dalhem, Valkenburg and Herzogenrath (now part of the Dutch Province of Limburg).) (1183–1430) Duchy of Guelders (Note: The county, later duchy, of Guelders consisted of four quarters, as they were separated by rivers: situated upstream Upper Quarter (the present day northern half of the Dutch province of Limburg), spatially separated from the three downstream Lower Quarters: County of Zutphen (after 1182), Veluwe Quarter and Nijmegen Quarter. The three lower quarters emerged from the historic gau Hamaland (named after the Chamavi tribe), and formed the present day province of Gelderland. Guelders did not include the Cleves enclave Huissen and the independent counties of Buren and Culemborg, that were much later seceded to the province of Gelderland.) (1046–1543)	County of Flanders (862–1384)	County of Hainaut (1071–1432) County of Namur (981–1421)	Prince- Bishopric of Liège (Note: Throughout the Middle Ages, the bishopric was further expanded with the Duchy of Bouillon in 1096 (ceded to France in 1678), the acquisition of the county of Loon in 1366 and the county of Horne in 1568. The Lordship of Mechelen was also part of the Prince-Bishopric of Liège.)(980–1791)	Duchy of Luxembourg (1059–1443)
Frisian; Freedom (11th–16th centuries)	Burgundian Netherlands (1384–1482)					Prince- Bishopric of Liège (980–1791)	Burgundian Netherlands (1384–1482)
Habsburg Netherlands (1482–1795) (Seventeen Provinces after 1543) (Note: The name Seventeen Provinces came in use after the Habsburg emperor Charles V had re-acquired the Duchy of Guelders, and an continuous territory arose.)						Prince- Bishopric of Liège (980–1791)	Habsburg Netherlands (1482–1795) (Seventeen Provinces after 1543)
Dutch Republic (1581–1795)				Spanish Netherlands (1556–1714)		Prince- Bishopric of Liège (980–1791)	Spanish Netherlands (1556–1714)
Dutch Republic (1581–1795)				Austrian Netherlands (1714–1795)		Prince- Bishopric of Liège (980–1791)	Austrian Netherlands (1714–1795)
Dutch Republic (1581–1795)				United States of Belgium (1790)		Republic of Liège (1789–'91)	United States of Belgium (1790)
Dutch Republic (1581–1795)				Austrian Netherlands (1795–1797)		P.-Bish. of Liège (1791–1794)	Austrian Netherlands (1795–1797)
Batavian Republic (1795–1806); Kingdom of Holland (1806–1810)			associated with French First Republic (1795–1804) part of First French Empire (1804–1815)				
part of First French Empire (1810–1813)			associated with French First Republic (1795–1804) part of First French Empire (1804–1815)				
Sovereign Principality of the Netherlands (1813–1815)			associated with French First Republic (1795–1804) part of First French Empire (1804–1815)				
United Kingdom of the Netherlands (1815–1830)							Grand Duchy of Luxembourg (from 1815)
Kingdom of the Netherlands (from 1839)				Kingdom of Belgium (from 1830)			Grand Duchy of Luxembourg (from 1815)
Kingdom of the Netherlands (from 1839)				Kingdom of Belgium (from 1830)			Grand Duchy of Luxembourg (from 1890)

In the course of the French Revolution, the entire region (including territories that were never under Habsburg rule, like the Prince-Bishopric of Liège) was overrun by French armies after they won the Battle of Sprimont in 1794. The territory was then annexed to the Republic (October 1, 1795).

Only a minority of the population – mostly the local Jacobins and other members of "Societies of Friends of Liberty and Equality" in urban areas – supported the annexation. The majority were hostile to the French regime, above all because of the imposition of the assignat, wholesale conscription, and the ferocious antireligious policies of the French revolutionaries. The opposition was first led by the Catholic clergy, which became an irreducible enemy of the French Republic after it dissolved convents and monasteries and confiscated ecclesiastical properties, ordered the separation of Church and State, shut down the University of Louvain and other Catholic educational institutions, regulated church attendance and introduced divorce. In 1797, nearly 8000 priests refused to swear the newly introduced Oath of Hatred of Kings ("serment de haine à la royauté"), and went into hiding to escape arrest and deportation. The situation, particularly in the religious field, eased with the rise to power of Bonaparte in 1799, but soon, the intensification of conscription, the police state and the Continental System, which brought ruin to Ostend and Antwerp, reignited opposition to French rule. During that period Belgium was divided into nine départements: Deux-Nèthes, Dyle, Escaut, Forêts, Jemmape, Lys, Meuse-Inférieure, Ourthe and Sambre-et-Meuse.

Austria confirmed the loss of its territories by the Treaty of Campo Formio, in 1797.

In anticipation of Napoleon's defeat in 1814, it was hotly debated inside Austrian ruling circles whether Austria should get the Southern Netherlands back or, in view of the experience gained after the War of the Spanish Succession about the difficulty of defending non contiguous possessions, whether she should not instead obtain contiguous territorial compensations in Northern Italy. This latter viewpoint won and the Congress of Vienna allotted the Southern Netherlands to the new United Kingdom of the Netherlands. After the Belgian Revolution of 1830, the region separated to become the independent Kingdom of Belgium.

== See also ==
- Catholic Church in the Netherlands, in Belgium and in Luxembourg
- Habsburg monarchy
- History of Belgium
- List of governors of the Habsburg Netherlands
- List of plenipotentiaries of Austrian Netherlands
- Seventeen Provinces
- Spanish Armada
- Union of Atrecht (Including map, 1579)
