= Philip, Duke of Parma =

Duke of Parma, Piacenza and Guastalla from 1748 to 1765

Philip
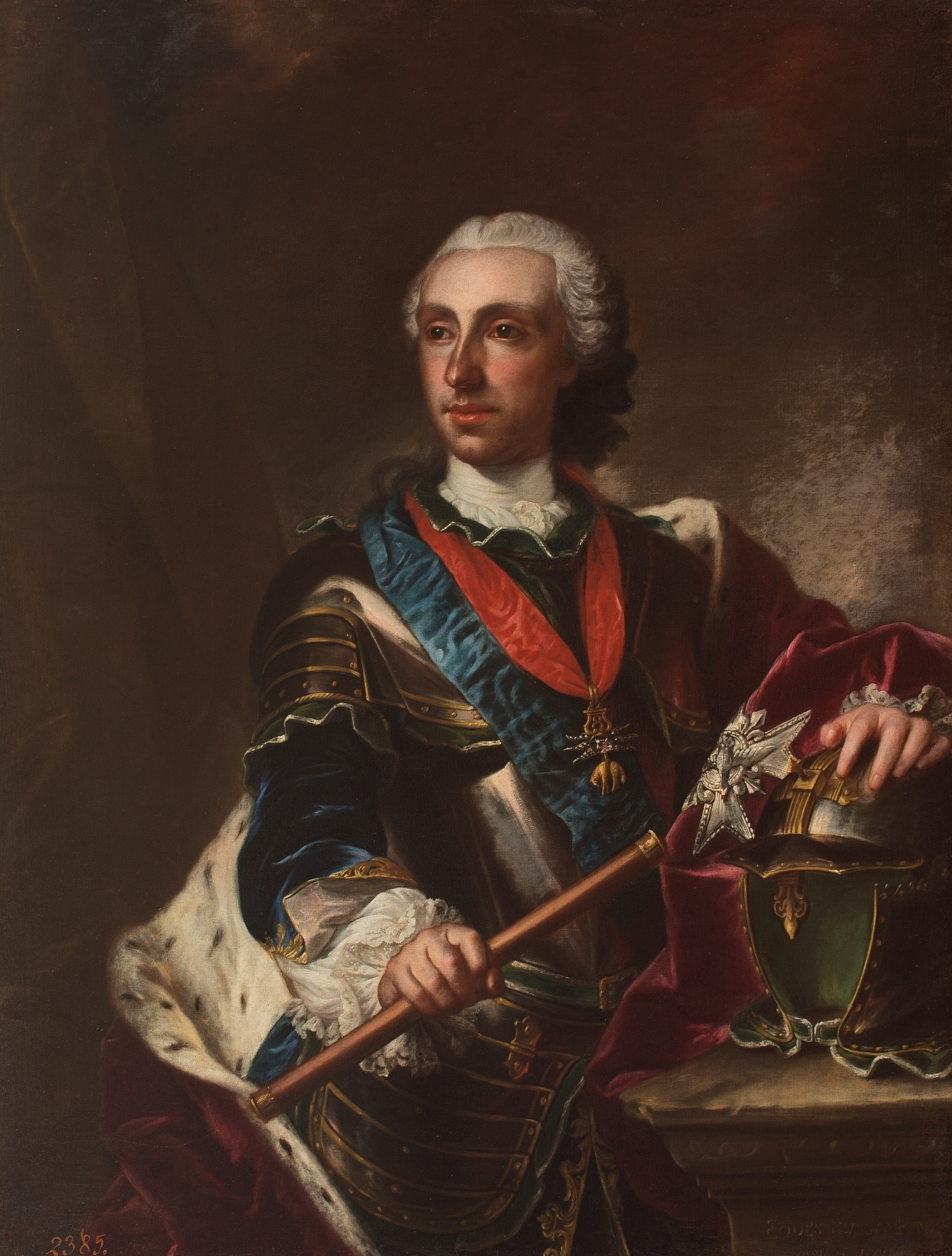
- Portrait by Francesco Carlo Rusca, 1745

Duke of Parma, Piacenza and Guastalla
- Reign: 18 October 1748 – 18 July 1765
- Predecessor: Maria Theresa (Parma and Piacenza); Giuseppe Maria Gonzaga (Guastalla)
- Successor: Ferdinand
- Born: 15 March 1720; Royal Alcazar, Madrid, Spain
- Died: 18 July 1765 (aged 45); Alessandria, Kingdom of Sardinia
- Burial: Sanctuary of Santa Maria della Steccata
- Spouse: Louise Élisabeth of France (m. 1739; died 1759)
- Issue: Isabella, Archduchess of Austria; Ferdinand I, Duke of Parma; Maria Luisa, Queen of Spain
Names
- Spanish: Felipe de Borbón y Farnesio; Italian: Filippo di Borbone
- House: Bourbon-Parma (founder)
- Father: Philip V of Spain
- Mother: Elisabeth Farnese
- Religion: Roman Catholicism

Philip (Spanish: Felipe, Italian: Filippo; 15 March 1720 – 18 July 1765) was Duke of Parma from 18 October 1748 until his death in 1765. A Spanish infante by birth, he was born in Madrid as the second son of King Philip V and Queen Elisabeth. He became Duke of Parma as a result of the 1748 Treaty of Aix-la-Chapelle. The duchy had earlier been ruled by Philip's elder brother, the future Charles III of Spain, and by their maternal ancestors. Philip founded the House of Bourbon-Parma, a cadet line of the House of Bourbon. He was a first cousin and son-in-law of the French king Louis XV.

== Life ==
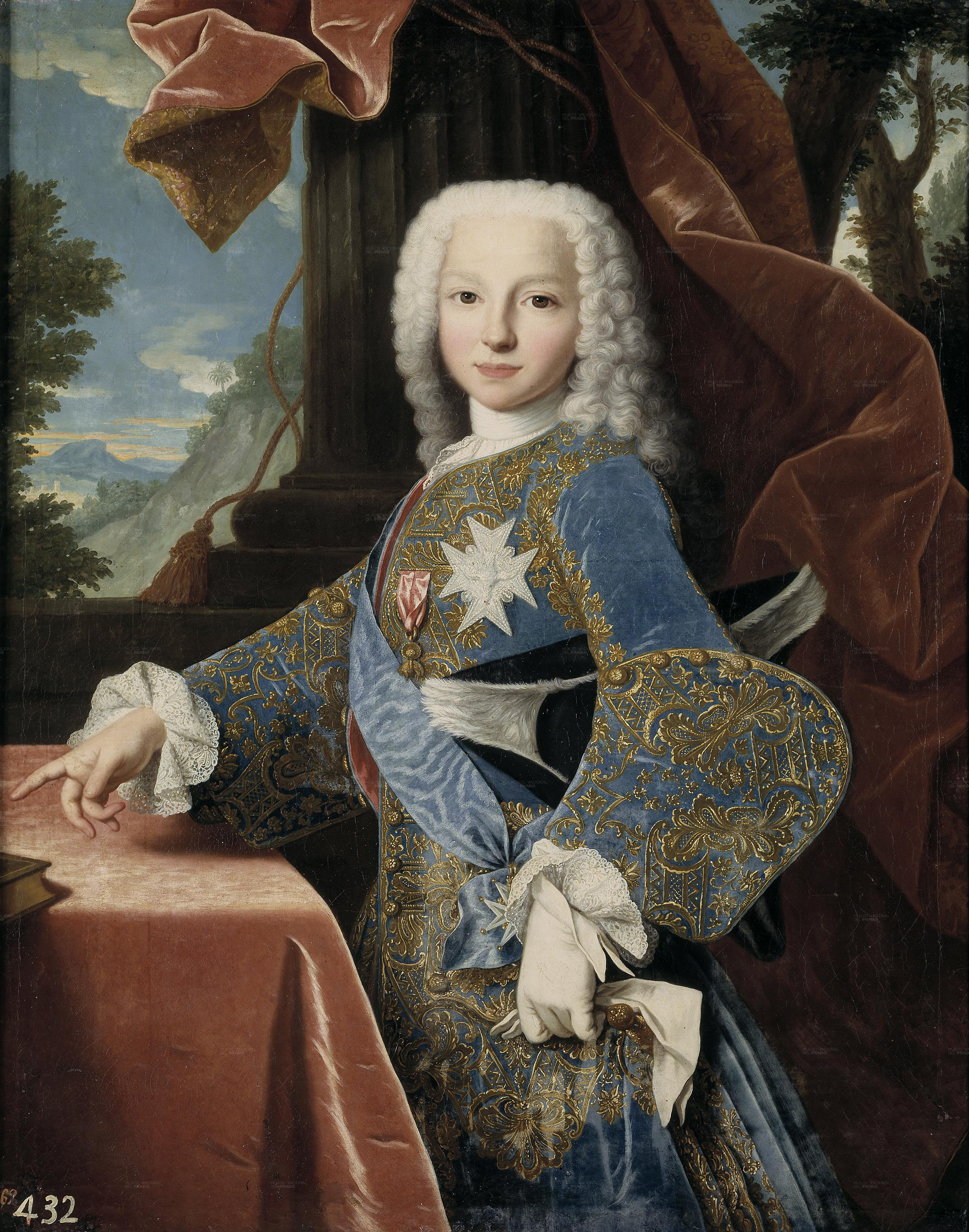
Portrait of the Infante as a child, by Jean Ranc, c. 1725-32

Born at the Royal Alcazar in Madrid as Felipe de Borbón y Farnesio, he was the fourth child of Philip V of Spain and his second wife, Elisabeth Farnese. He was raised in Madrid and as a child showed more interest in art than in politics. As was usual for a child of the Spanish royal family, he was raised in the Queen's household until the age of seven, with the Marchioness of Montehermoso as his governess. He was also the 12th Count of Chinchón and Grandee of Spain First Class with a coat of arms of Bourbon after the alienation with royal authorization in 1738 of the 11th Count of Chinchón, Don Jose Sforza-Cesarini, Duke of Canzano, a title he later ceded to his brother Luis in 1754.

His mother came from the family of Farnese, which had ruled the Duchy of Parma, Piacenza and Guastalla for many generations. The duchy had been ruled between 1731 and 1736 by his elder brother Charles, but was exchanged with Austria for the Two Sicilies after the War of Polish Succession. Twelve years later, in the Treaty of Aix-la-Chapelle (1748), Austria lost the duchy, and Philip became the new duke, founding the House of Bourbon-Parma.

In 1724, his father Philip V abdicated in favor of his son Louis, who became Louis I of Spain. At this point, the four year old infante Philip was assigned the Marquis of Surco as governor of his household to ensure a smooth running of his daily life, where he and his siblings lived away from their parents.

As part of the Second Treaty of Versailles (1757) between Austria and France, it was intended that Philip would become king of the Southern Netherlands in a deal that would see French troops occupy key positions in the country – however this arrangement was repudiated by the subsequent Third Treaty of Versailles and Philip continued in Parma.

The Duchy of Parma was ruined by many years of warfare, and in 1759 Philip named the able Frenchman Guillaume du Tillot as his minister to restore the economy. Philip was an enlightened ruler who stimulated education and philosophy, attracting personalities like Étienne Bonnot de Condillac and Alexandre Deleyre. During the later years of his life, he had an affair with opera singer Caterina Gabrielli.

=== Marriage ===
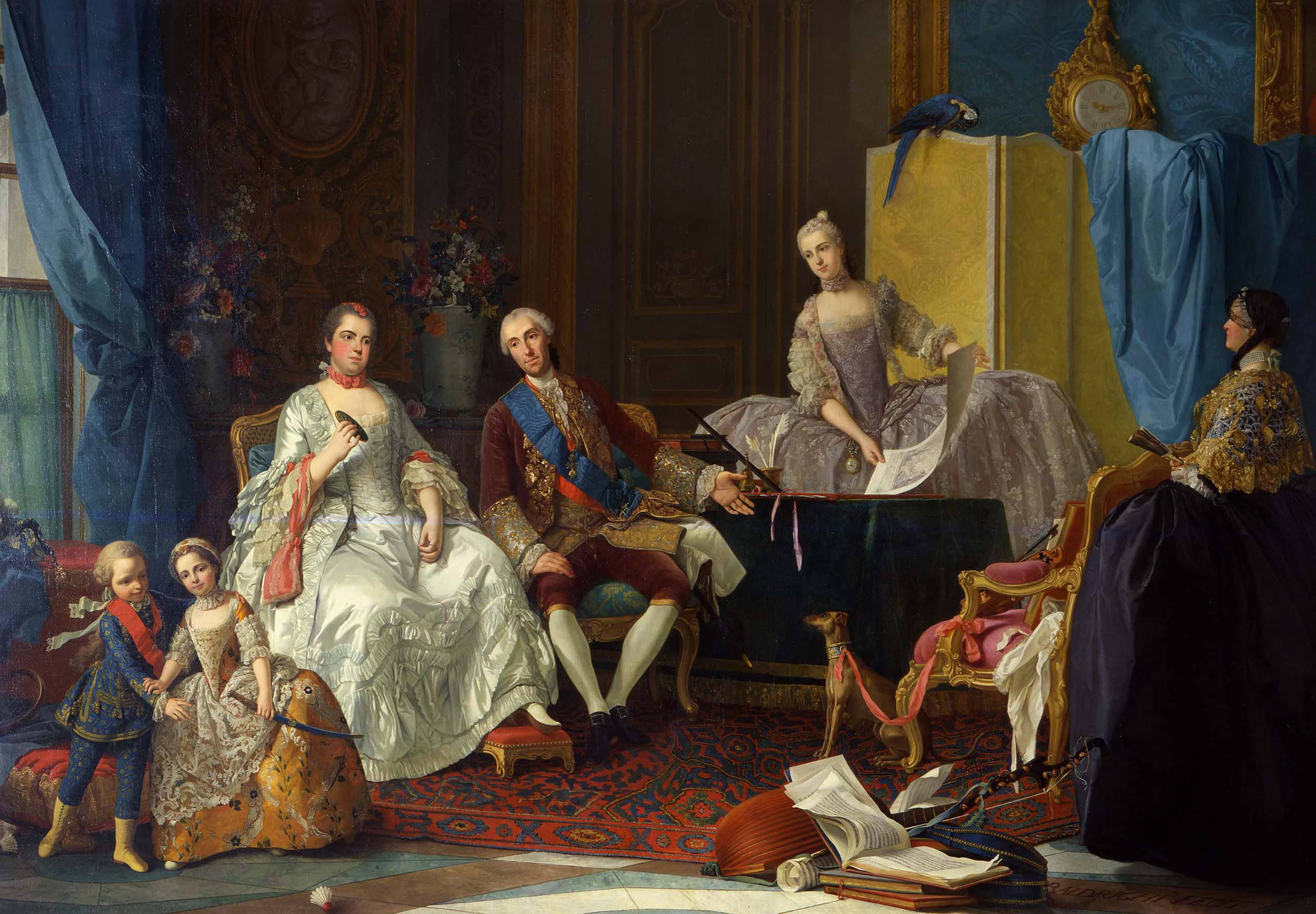
Portrait of the Duke of Parma with his family, by Giuseppe Baldrighi, c. 1757

Philip married his first cousin once removed Princess Louise Élisabeth of France in Alcalá de Henares, Spain on 25 October 1739. They had three children.

1. Princess Isabella of Parma (31 December 1741 – 27 November 1763) – she married Marie Antoinette's older brother, the Austrian emperor, Archduke Joseph of Austria. She had issue, but all her children died in childhood.
2. Ferdinand I, Duke of Parma (20 January 1751 – 9 October 1802) – he succeeded his father as Duke of Parma and married Archduchess Maria Amalia of Austria and left issue.
3. Princess Luisa Maria of Parma (9 December 1751 – 2 January 1819) married Charles IV of Spain and left issue.

Their marriage was an unhappy one, and Louise Elisabeth died of smallpox at the age of 32 in 1759. Philip himself also died of smallpox unexpectedly on 18 July 1765 in Alessandria, Sardinia,after having accompanied his daughter Maria Luisa on her way to Genoa, where she sailed for Spain to marry Infante Charles. Through Philip's daughter Maria Luisa, he is an ancestor of the Bourbons of Spain, the Bourbons of the Two Sicilies, and the House of Orléans.

== Ancestors ==
Ancestors of Philip, Duke of Parma

8. Louis XIV of France
4. Louis, Dauphin of France
9. Maria Theresa of Austria
2. Philip V of Spain
10. Ferdinand Maria, Elector of Bavaria
5. Maria Anna Victoria of Bavaria
11. Henriette Adelaide of Savoy
1. Philip, Duke of Parma
12. Ranuccio II Farnese, Duke of Parma
6. Odoardo Farnese, Hereditary Prince of Parma
13. Isabella d'Este
3. Elisabeth Farnese
14. Philip William, Elector Palatine
7. Dorothea Sophie of Neuburg
15. Princess Elisabeth Amalie of Hesse-Darmstadt

== Honours ==
- France: Knight of the Order of the Holy Spirit (22 March 1736)

== Heraldry ==
Heraldry of Philip, Duke of Parma

Coat of arms as Infante of Spain

Coat of arms as Duke of Parma, Piacenza and Guastalla

Philip, Duke of Parma House of Bourbon-Parma Cadet branch of the House of Bourbon Born: 15 March 1720 Died: 18 July 1765
Regnal titles
Preceded by Maria Theresa (Parma and Piacenza); Giuseppe Maria Gonzaga (Guastalla)	Duke of Parma, Piacenza and Guastalla; 1748–1765	Succeeded by Ferdinand
Spanish nobility
Preceded by Philip V of Spain	Count of Chinchón; 1738–1754	Succeeded by Infante Luis of Spain
Preceded by Philip V of Spain	Duke of Canzano; 1748–1765	Succeeded by Infante Luis of Spain
