= Treaty of Versailles (1758) =

Agreement between Austria and France

The Treaty of Versailles of 1758, also called the Third Treaty of Versailles, was signed between Austria and France. It confirmed the earlier treaties signed at Versailles in 1756 and 1757 but revoked the 1757 treaty's agreement to create an independent state in the Austrian Netherlands, ruled by Philip, Duke of Parma; the region remained under Austrian rule. Instead, Parma and Piacenza were restored to Austria. The treaty was officially dated 30 and 31 December 1757 but was signed in March 1759 and ratified in May of that year.

== Aftermath ==
France, which expected a swift victory against Prussia because of a coalition with Austria, Russia, Sweden, and Saxony, was confronted with the reality of the war. Although the decision to install a Bourbon monarch in the Austrian Netherlands was revoked, the treaty greatly hastened the coalition's growing desire not only to defeat but also to destroy Prussia. The treaty appears to have served more as a moral guarantee to the coalition than as an actual alliance, as the coalition suffered an undisputed string of defeats at the hands of Britain and Prussia from 1759.
