= Treaty of Versailles (1757) =

Agreement between Austria and France

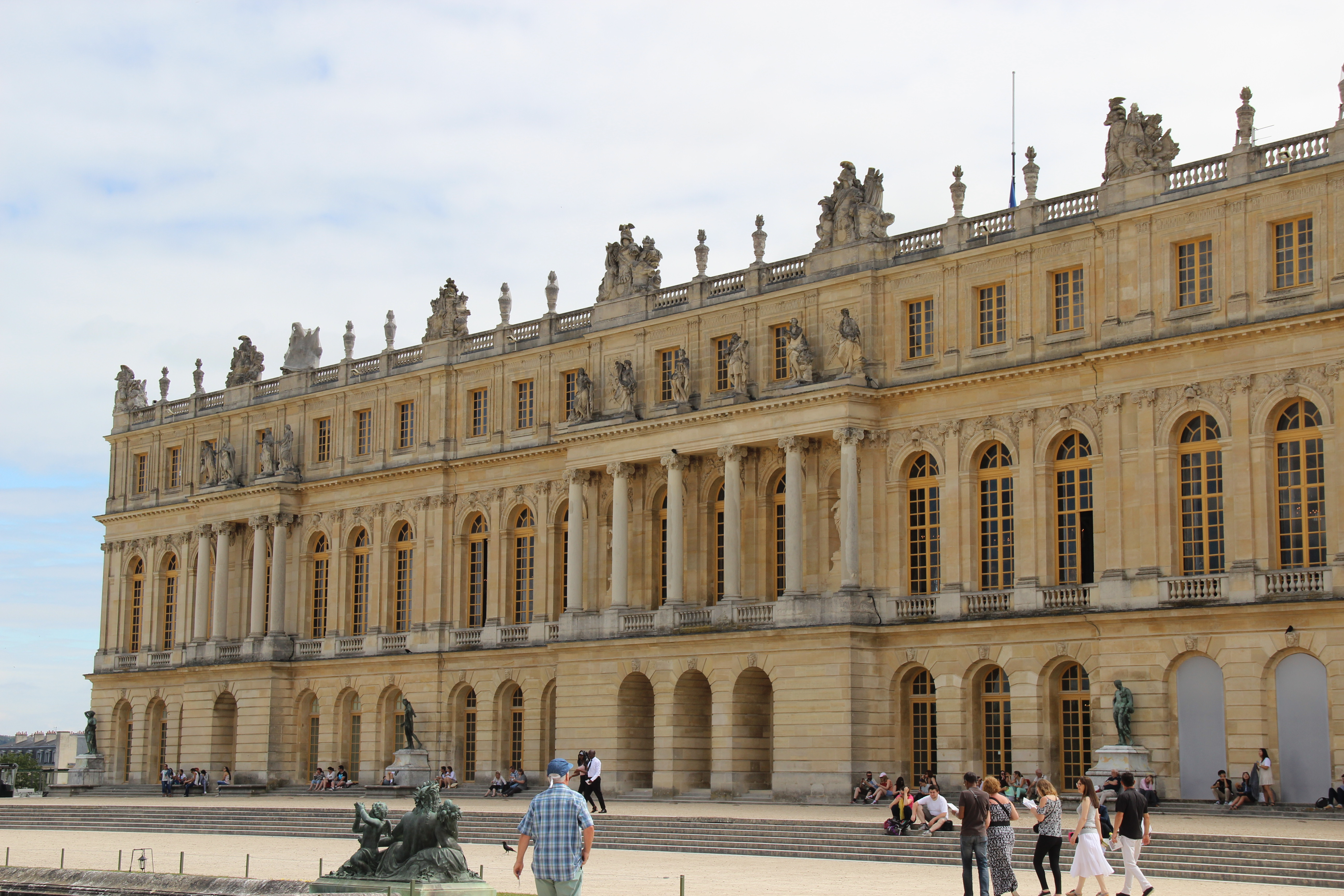
The treaty takes its name from the Palace of Versailles outside Paris.

The Treaty of Versailles was a diplomatic agreement signed between Austria and France at the Palace of Versailles on 1 May 1757 during the Seven Years' War. It expanded on the 1756 Treaty of Versailles, which had established the Franco-Austrian Alliance. It is thus commonly known as the Second Treaty of Versailles.

== Terms ==
In the new treaty, France agreed to assist Austria in regaining the province of Silesia from Prussia in exchange for Austria ceding the Austrian Netherlands to France at the war's conclusion, the acquisition of which had long been a goal of the French state. Financial subsidies paid from France to Austria were continued, which confirmed a British fear about the depth of the alliance.

In the wake of the treaty, French troops moved to occupy key ports and settlements in the Austrian Netherlands such as Ostend and Nieuport, freeing up their Austrian garrisons to move east to attack Prussia. That particularly alarmed Great Britain, which had long sought to prevent the French moving into the Low Countries, but the treaty brought to an end the barrier which had existed for forty years.

The French intended to put a Bourbon monarch from the Spanish branch of the dynasty, Duke Philip of Parma, on the throne of a new puppet state in the Southern Netherlands. In addition it was agreed that the towns of Chimay, Ostend, Beaumont, Nieuport, Ypres, Furnes and Mons would all be ceded directly to France.

The treaty also served to confirm a planned partition of Prussia, which was to take place between Russia, Sweden and Saxony.

== Aftermath ==
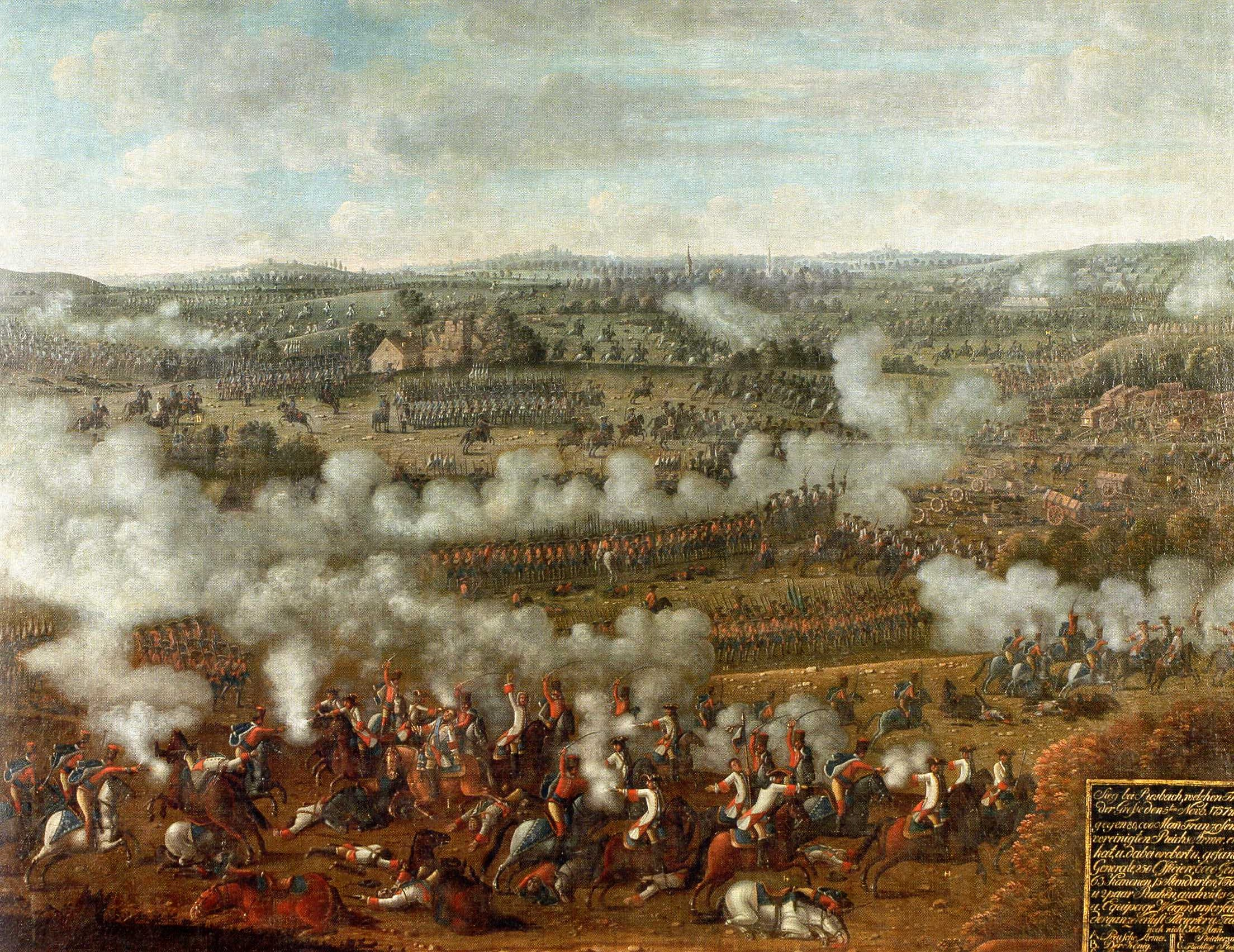
The Prussian victory at the Battle of Rossbach was a major blow to the Allies and led to the replacement of the Treaty the following year.

The terms were largely renounced by the subsequent Third Treaty of Versailles, as France and Austria were not able to achieve the swift victory over Prussia that they had envisaged, despite the assistance of Russia, Sweden and Saxony. Also, France was concerned that the war in Germany was drawing away troops and resources that needed to be directed against Great Britain, and the war had also prompted a financial crisis in Paris.

== See also ==
- France in the Seven Years' War

== Bibliography ==
- Anderson, Fred. Crucible of War: The Seven Years' War and the Fate of Empire in British North America, 1754–1766. Faber and Faber, 2000.
- Dull, Jonathon R. The French Navy in the Seven Years War. University of Nebraska Press, 2005.
- Simms, Brendan. Three Victories and a Defeat: The Rise and Fall of the First British Empire. Penguin Books, 2008.
- Szabo, Franz A.J. The Seven Years War in Europe, 1756–1763. Pearson, 2008.
