= Treaty of Versailles (1756) =

Agreement between Austria and France

The Treaty of Versailles, also known as the First Treaty of Versailles, was a diplomatic agreement between France and Austria. It was signed in 1756 at the Palace of Versailles in France. There were four treaties signed on this agreement.

== Terms ==
The two countries offered mutual assistance if attacked by Great Britain or Prussia. The Franco-Austrian Alliance, which lasted in some form or another for the next 30 years, was established.

== Aftermath ==
Within months of the agreement, France and Austria found themselves engaged in the Seven Years' War against the Anglo-Prussian Alliance, which was to last until 1763. Along with the Westminster Convention, the treaty formed part of the Diplomatic Revolution, which realigned the alliance systems of the major powers of Europe in the run-up to the wars.

It was ostensibly defensive, but British agents suspected that there were secret clauses that were more wide-ranging than the document actually publicized.

The Second Treaty of Versailles, promising even closer co-operation between the two states, was agreed at Versailles in 1757.

== Sources ==
- Anderson, Fred (2000). Crucible of War: The Seven Years' War and the Fate of Empire in British North America, 1754–1766. Faber and Faber.
- Simms, Brendan. Three Victories and a Defeat: The Rise and Fall of the First British Empire. Penguin Books, 2008.
