= History of Bourbon Sicily =

History of Sicily under the Bourbon dynasty (1734–1860)

The history of Bourbon Sicily began in 1734, when Charles of Bourbon moved to conquer the Two Sicilies, removing them from Austrian rule. This historical period ended in July 1860, when, following the Expedition of the Thousand, the Bourbon troops were defeated and withdrawn, partly due to the support of the Sicilian population. Subsequently, Sicily was annexed to the constituent Kingdom of Italy.

Coat of Arms of Ferdinand III of Sicily

== Background ==
Spain possessed in 1700 the largest empire in the world: present to some degree on all continents, and suffocated at home by clear political and commercial decadence, its legacy attracted the major European powers, just as it was of great concern in whose hands such dominion would pass. England, which had long been waging war against Spain on the oceans, joined in an alliance with the Netherlands and the Holy Roman Empire, supporting with arms the Austrian heir entitled to the Spanish throne: Archduke Charles VI of Habsburg; he had supporters in Sicily and in the remaining Iberian dominions, since he was seen as the legitimate continuator of the House of Habsburg, which by then had ruled the Sicilian throne for as much as 200 years. However, Spain's chosen heir was instead Philip V of Bourbon, son of the Grand Dauphin, Louis, who was destined to succeed to the throne of France as successor to Louis XIV, the Sun King: the one who had tried to conquer Sicily two decades earlier.

This union between two powerful monarchical houses, sole heirs to the vast Spanish Empire, sparked the warlike conflict in Europe known as the War of the Spanish Succession. The French and British had attempted before the death of the last Habsburg of Spain to peacefully partition the empire (this was attempted in two different treaties): France had demanded to possess Sicily along with the other Italian dominions, while it would leave Spain and the Indies, i.e., the Americas, to the Habsburg empire. However, the agreements had broken down because Charles of Habsburg refused to be crowned ruler of Spain and the Indies without also obtaining the centuries-old crown of the Kingdom of Sicily.

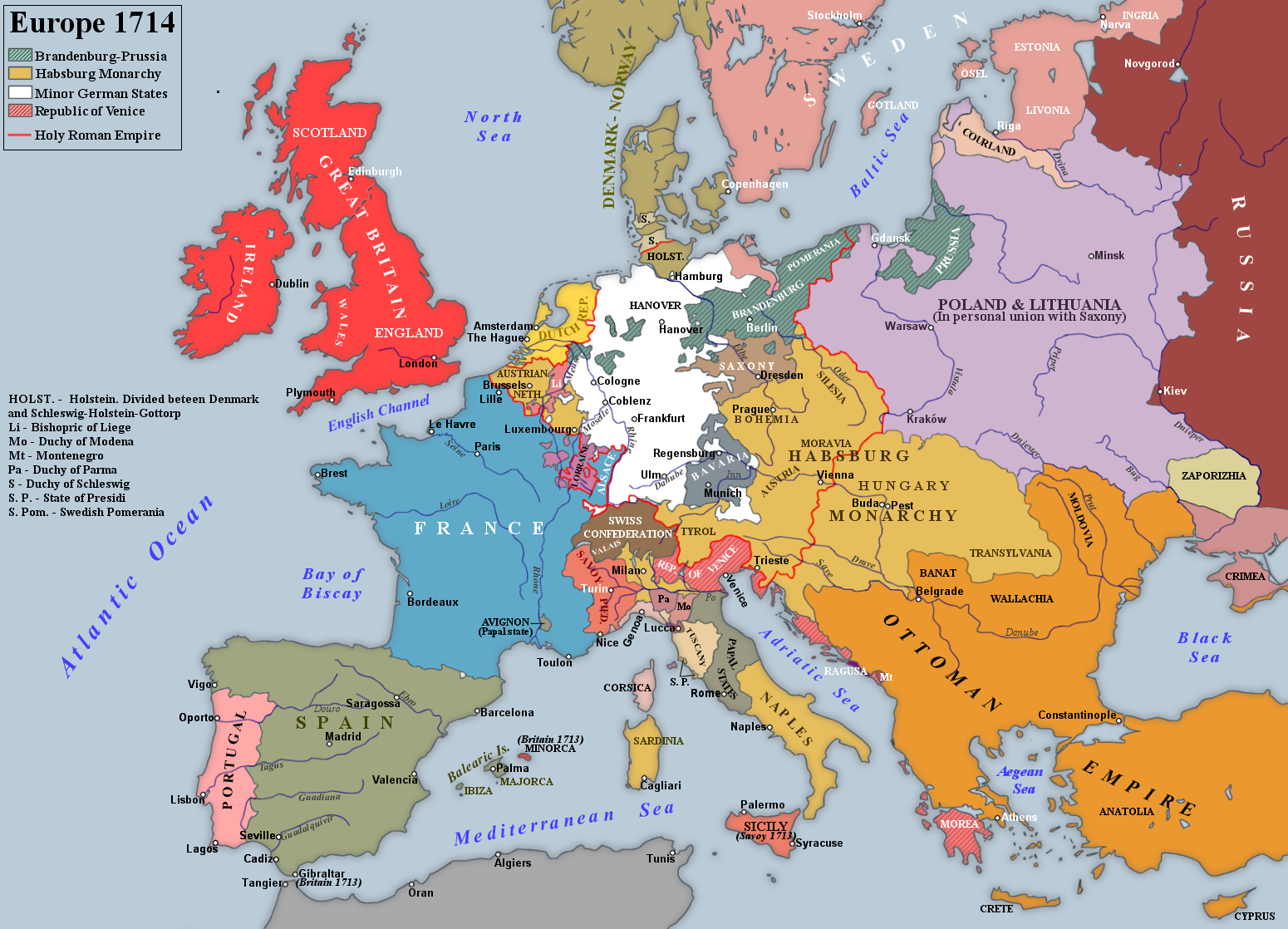
Europe after the Peace of Utrecht: Sicily in pink, detached from Spain and united with the House of Savoy (Piedmont)

The Sicilian situation took a turn for the worse when the Anglo-Habsburg allies conquered the Kingdom of Naples for the Austrian Archduke, thus reaching the Sicilian borders in 1707.

The war continued in Europe and the rest of the world, with considerable bloodshed, especially for the French, until Emperor Joseph I of Habsburg suddenly died in 1711, which meant for Philip of Bourbon's rival, namely Charles of Habsburg, the ascension to the throne of the Holy Roman Empire. England, which saw in Habsburg power a danger as great as that of Spain, refused at this point to continue supporting the Habsburgs for the Iberian throne (just as it did not want a Spain united with France, it also absolutely rejected a Spain united with the vast Habsburg area). This led to a peace treaty between the powers: the Treaty of Utrecht, signed in 1713.

With this treaty, England stood as victors and France and Spain as defeated nations, and the final dissolution of the Spanish Empire was sanctioned. The English then decided the fate of Sicily by taking it away from the Spaniards and handing it over, literally, to a figure quite unexpected to the Sicilians and the other warring powers: the Piedmontese Duke Victor Amadeus II of Savoy.

England then decided to resolve the "Sicilian" question by giving it neither to the French nor to the Austrians; in fact, the new emperor was given the Kingdom of Naples, the Duchy of Milan, and Sardinia was given to the German Bavaria, but he, precisely because of the lack of the Sicilian crown, did not want to sign the peace of Utrecht: the war of Austria and the Holy Roman Empire would continue for another two years, until Charles VI signed the peace of Rastatt, by which he decided to accept what had been established at Utrecht.

On the island, long before the invasion, word had already spread that Spain was returning to claim what Utrecht had taken from it. Victor Amadeus knew he was in an extremely precarious condition on that throne: there were too many powerful claimants to keep him unharmed. The powers had united by forming the Quadruple Alliance: the British, French, Austrians and Dutch at war with the Spanish, stipulated that the crown of Sicily should go to the Emperor of Austria, since the Savoy on their own could not protect the Mediterranean island from the sights of Philip V of Bourbon's army.

Let even the devil come and rule Sicily, as long as the Spanish do not come.

— Abbot Giovanni Battista Caruso on the impending Spanish return to Sicily.

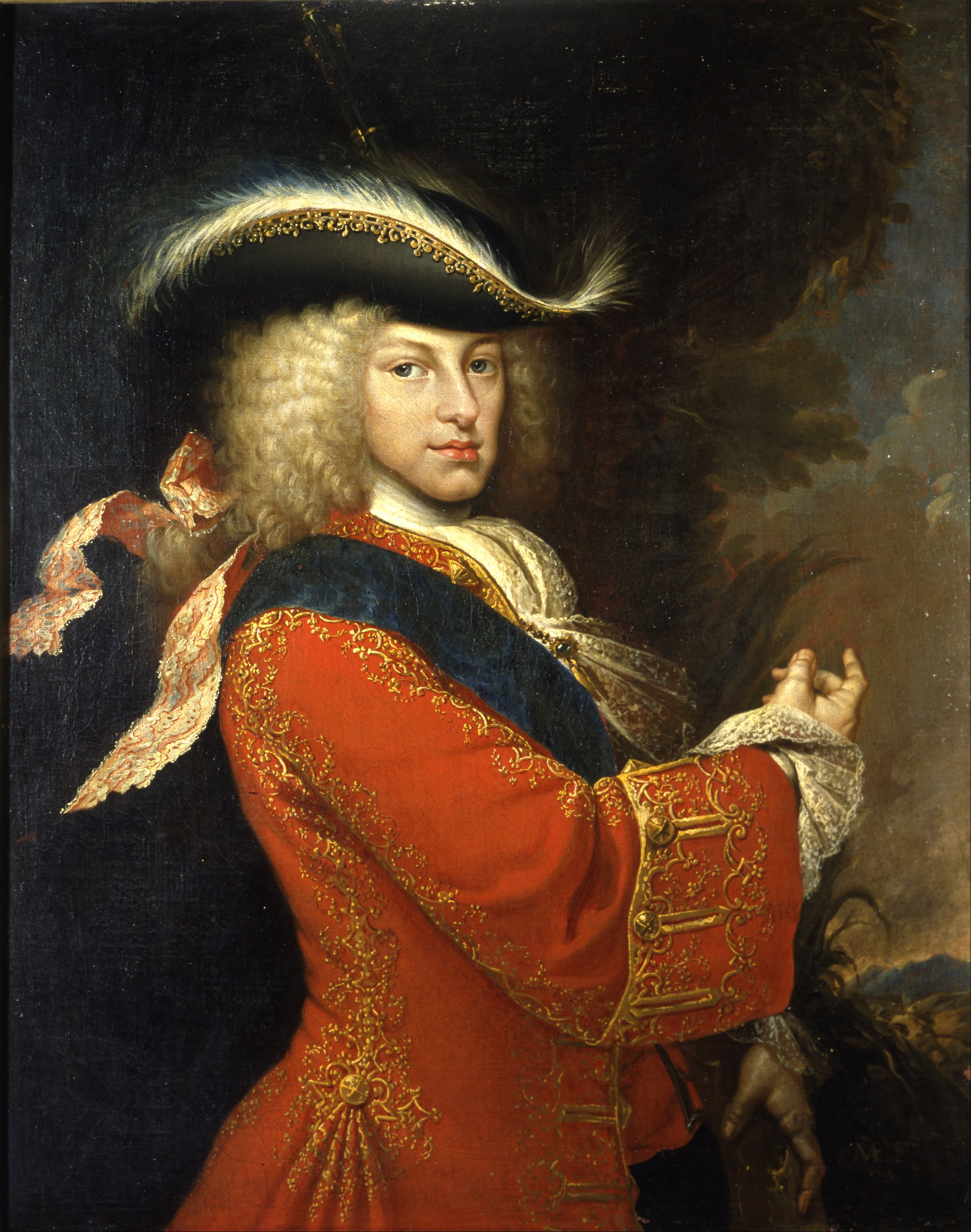
Philip V of Bourbon, king of Spain and king of the Indies, ordered in 1718 the attack on Sicily to reconquer it

On July 1, 1718, the Spaniards landed in Sicily, near Solunto (in the gulf of the same name, which later became the Gulf of Termini Imerese), landing 30,000 men-at-arms, whose orders were to take Sicily by force from the Savoyards and bring the Sicilians back under the Iberian crown. The Savoy king's order was in turn to keep the crown of the island for the Savoy, so there was no capitulation of the kingdom.

Believing that Palermo was not capable of being defended, Piedmontese Viceroy Annibale Maffei, together with the Palermo Senate, negotiated its surrender to the Spaniards on July 2 with their commander, Jean François de Bette, Marquess of Lede. Maffei at the same time ordered his men to set out for Syracuse, which, unlike Palermo and other Sicilian cities, had been fashioned over the centuries by the Spaniards with the main purpose of resisting the enemy to the bitter end, so it was evaluated by the Piedmontese king (for several years already) as the best place in which to entrench and wait for events to unfold. Although against their will, the Savoyards were finally forced to surrender Sicily to Austria. German soldiers then prevented the Spaniards from returning to the island.

The new territorial arrangement, however, did not satisfy the major houses of Europe, and the reason for ousting Austria from Sicily was given by the War of Polish Succession, which erupted in 1733: the new Austro-Russian-Prussian alliance, formed by the Treaty of the Three Black Eagles (Bund der drei schwarzen Adler), had sided with the candidate Augustus III of Poland, outraging France, which instead supported Louis XV's father-in-law, Stanislaw Leszczyński. Since the French were unable to counter the troops of Anna Ivanovna Romanova (Empress of All Russia), who had brought Poland into her orbit, they then decided to attack Charles VI's possessions, thus substantiating a new war in Sicily, the purpose of which was to take it away from the Habsburg Empire.

== Early Sicilian Bourbon period ==
=== The conquest ===
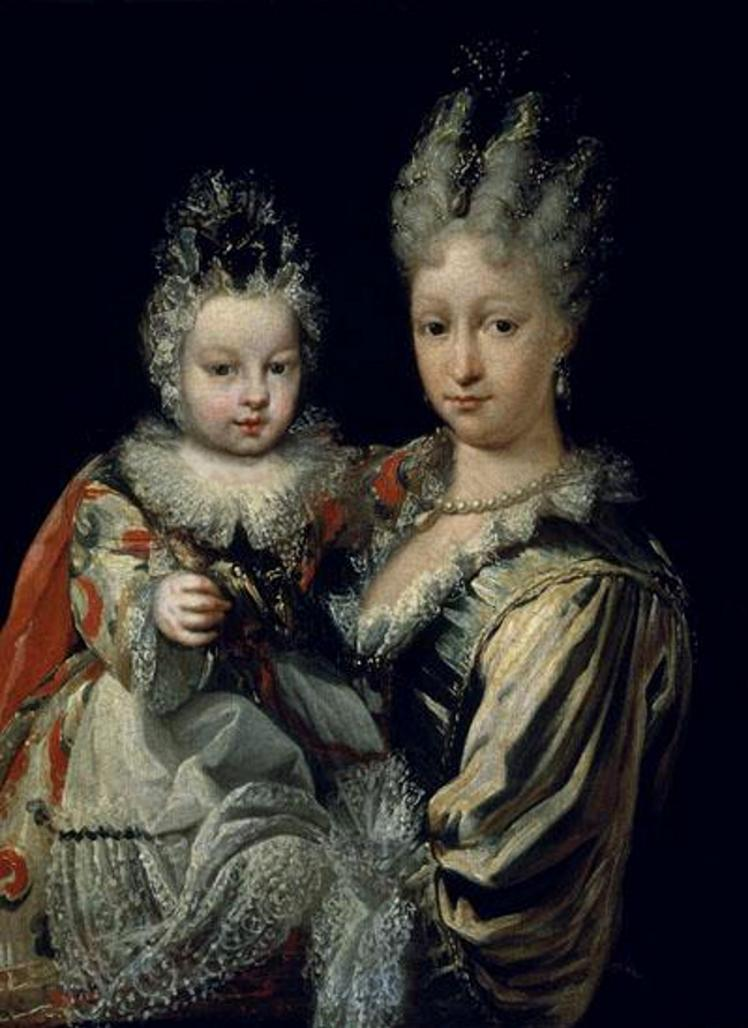
The infante of Spain, Charles of Bourbon, in the arms of his mother Elisabeth Farnese, an ambitious woman who, by indulging the Spanish desire for revenge in Italy, succeeded in procuring the throne of Sicily for her first-born son

Louis XV of France made a family pact with Bourbon Spain by which the two nations swore to protect each other (El Escorial, Nov. 7, 1733). This pact promised the King of Spain's eldest son born to his second wife, the Duke of Parma and Piacenza, Charles Sebastian of Bourbon, the southern European domains of the Holy Roman Empire, i.e., both Kingdoms of Naples and Sicily, which were, however, to be kept strictly separate from the Spanish throne.

Charles of Habsburg had, all things considered, fairly peacefully accepted the cession of his northern domains in Italy to the Infante of Spain. To the Neapolitan Kingdom he was unable or unwilling to give much relief (the conquest began in March 1734 and ended with the siege and conquest of the two Italic strongholds, Gaeta and Capua, in November of that year). He was doing this for the sake of his empire, wanting to pass it on to his daughter Maria Theresa of Austria, and thus needing the powers to accept his Pragmatic Sanction. However, when the time came for the Allies to conquer Sicily, the Habsburgs became serious about Syracuse in particular, choosing it as their last major stronghold against the Franco-Spanish plans and British acquiescence.

While still fighting for the Neapolitan kingdom, Charles VI gave orders to his troops to move to Syracuse: German soldiers were arriving there from Italian cities and also from other Sicilian cities. The Spanish troops, now allied with the French as well as the British, had landed on the western side of the island since the summer of '34 and, having conquered the area without difficulty (except for Trapani, also a fortress, which held out), had appointed the Duke of Montemar, José Carrillo de Albornoz as the new viceroy of Sicily.

On March 9, 1735, Charles of Bourbon, then less than 20 years old, set out for Sicily with the intention of completing its conquest. The future king landed in Messina, to witness the taking of the Royal Citadel: it had surrendered on February 23, 1735. From this time onward the heavy siege of Syracuse began, concentrating on it the Hispanic crown's aims: after having the population forcibly evacuated to the neighboring countryside, Germans and Spaniards opened fire on the city, and from May, for 24 days, the artillery of the Ejército de Tierra poured inside the walls; approximately 2000 bombs were dropped there. At the same time that palaces, roads and various structures were being destroyed, there came from the Austrian emperor a kind of incentive for the Syracusans: he promised them, in the event of victory, the restoration of the city as the capital of Sicily as a reward for their loyalty to the Austrian Empire. If he had kept his word it would surely have been a momentous change, since Syracuse had lost its title and powers as capital since the distant Arab rule.

Inside the walls the bombardment continued, but without significant casualties, not even among the Germans: according to some sources the limited number of casualties and destruction of civilian buildings occurred because the Spaniards deliberately bombarded the city with “great discretion,” and precision, aiming exclusively at the fortifications. The team of military engineers in charge of directing the Spanish bombers belonged to the school of Sébastien Le Prestre de Vauban (one of the greatest military engineers in history who flourished in the court of the Sun King). On 1 June 1735, the capitulation finally came.

=== The birth of the Bourbon Kingdom ===
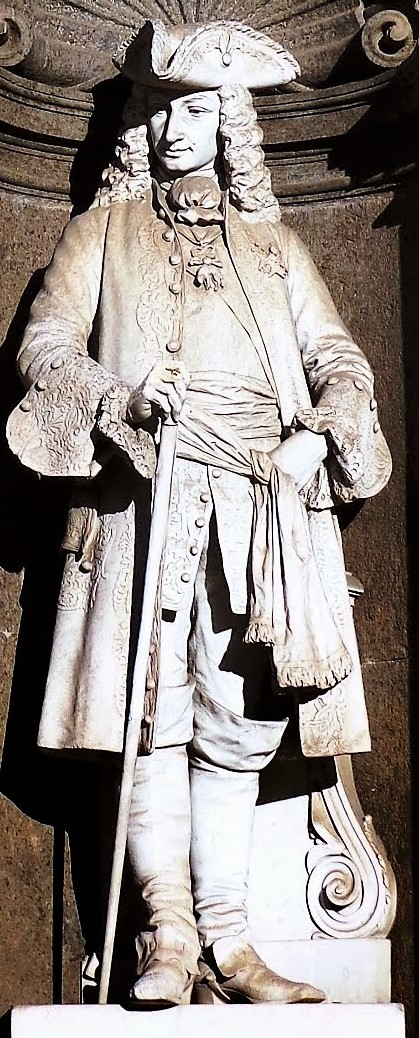
Statue of Charles of Bourbon, carved many years after the taking of the Sicilian crown (Royal Palace of Naples)

Charles of Bourbon wished to leave Messina and head to where the siege was in progress, to make his authority felt and thus hasten the process of capitulation. However, he was strongly advised not to go to Syracuse, either before or after the surrender. The reasons given were that there were no practicable roads to reach it. The Iberian infante protested, but eventually gave up. He was sent aboard at Milazzo for Palermo, where he landed on May 19, and there he waited for the fall of Syracuse to officially declare the day of his coronation as king of Sicily.

His days in Palermo passed quietly, surrounded by the many island nobles and festivities. When news of the Aretusean capture finally reached him on June 4, Charles sent for all the representatives of the cities of the Kingdom to swear allegiance to the new ruler, and he elected knights and councillors of the new government. The next day Charles had himself blessed with the Blessed Sacrament by the bishop of Syracuse, Matteo Trigona (who had long been in Palermo).

Charles publicly denied, as he was evidently accused, the existence of premeditated arrangements for the Syracusan conquest (it had long been rumored, ever since he set foot in Sicily, that there was a secret agreement with the imperial forces). The defenders of Syracuse were indeed hesitant (not only by word of mouth from the sovereign, but also from witnesses of the siege), but there was also a plot hatched in the European courts (probably the reason why no German reinforcements arrived in Sicily, unlike in the 1718s and 1719s, when the influx from the Germanic lands was continuous).

Since the first days of February 1735, England had imposed itself on France and Spain, forcing them to sit down at the negotiating table and, along with them, to end the Sicilian war turned against the Austrian emperor. If they had not agreed, the British would have declared to their possessions a close war in both North and South America, as well as in the East Indies.

Charles of Bourbon did not wait for the fall of Trapani, which, left to its own devices, capitulated on July 12. He decided to crown himself king of Sicily on July 3, 1735, in Palermo Cathedral, despite there being opposition from Pope Clement XII, who did not want to recognize him as the new legitimate ruler of the two kingdoms (Charles of Bourbon then decided to resort to the Apostolic Legation of Sicily, an ancient privilege of the island that guaranteed it a certain autonomy from the Church of Rome). Everything took place in a great hurry; not even the return of the Spanish troops from Syracuse, still in the Arethusian area on June 30, could be waited for, so the monarch had to rely on the escort of Palermo's workers for his solemn entry into the Sicilian capital Foreign powers enjoined the first Italic Bourbon ruler to leave Sicily immediately: he, in fact, left for Naples on July 8, 1735, on a Spanish warship, the Europa.

That same summer, France abandoned its ally and sat, alone, at the negotiating table with England. The preliminaries lasted a long time, and King George II of Hanover was only able to declare official peace in November 1738, with the Treaty of Vienna (although since November 1735 there had been no more fighting because of an acknowledged armistice, and Austria had called for peace talks as early as October of that year). From 1738 Charles of Bourbon was thus legitimized by the international community to rule Sicily alongside Naples; the Italic Kingdom of the Bourbons was officially born.

=== Peace and attempted reforms ===
With this new territorial arrangement came the loss of Sicily's military role, as the Italic kingdom was strictly detached from the more powerful Spain, which had attracted quite a few enemies to the island in the past, and deliberately kept apart from foreign wars.

Sicily was able to enjoy a long period of peace. As there were no longer constant threats that required its defense and placed it at the center of belligerent political projects, Sicilian affairs took a back seat for the Bourbon rulers, who increasingly focused on the urban and industrial affairs of Campania alone, their court land. Paradoxically, although they were closer than the sovereigns of the Iberian peninsula, they became strangers to the Sicilians.

The strong link with Spain was gradually severed: the Spaniards were ousted from every aspect of life in the Italic kingdom, ultimately from the military. The Sicilians continued to have no army of their own; soldiers from the Kingdom of Naples took the place of the Iberians. Charles III of Bourbon attempted to reform the political and administrative apparatus of the island, but he clashed with the baronial power of the locals, which was very strong on the island since in more than three hundred years of viceroyalty, the governing men of Sicily – that is, the island nobility – had been able to grant themselves so many privileges and rights that would normally have belonged to a sovereign who had been physically absent from the island for too many centuries. Charles failed in his attempt to wrest power from them and reform the Sicilian political order.

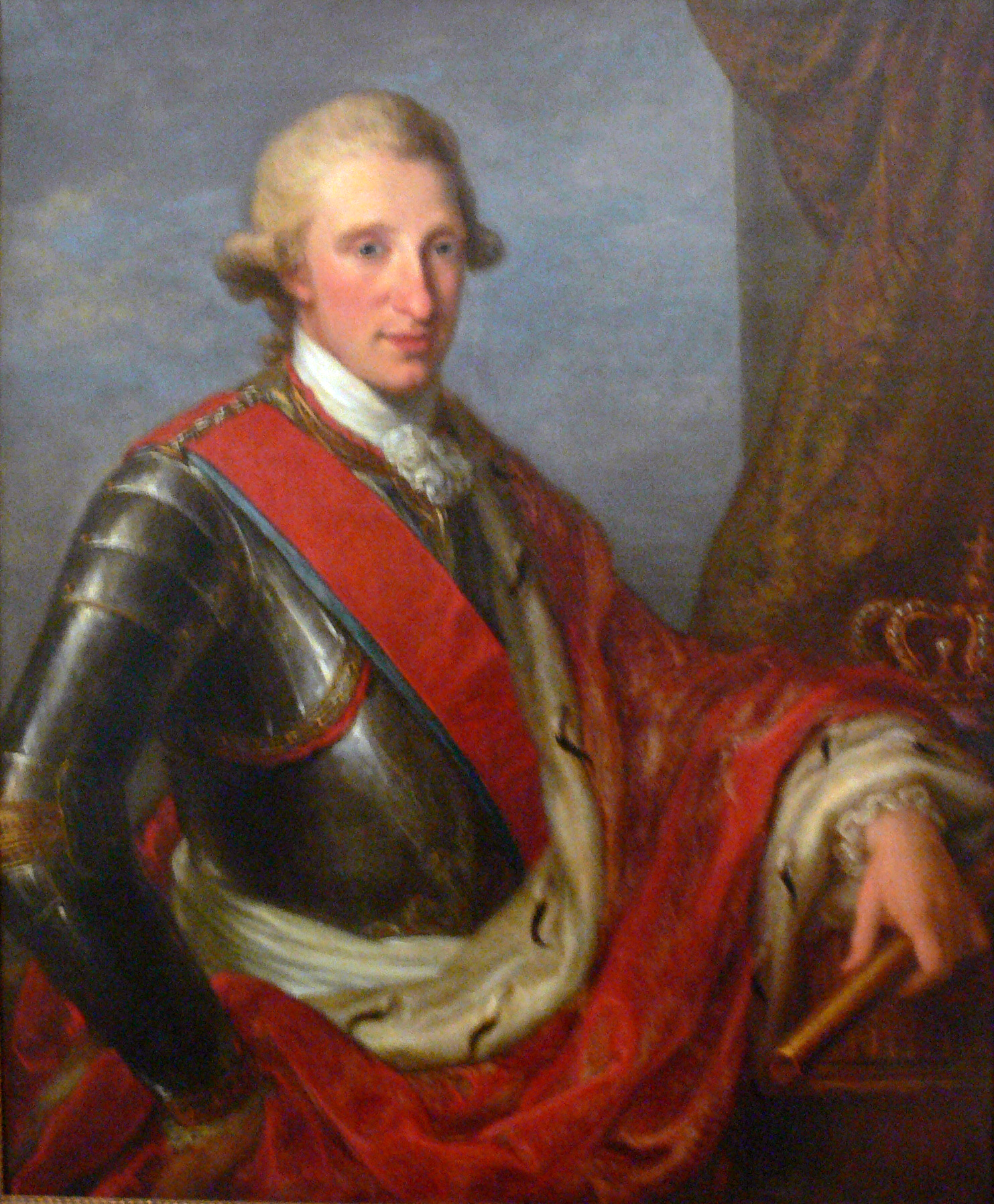
Ferdinand III of Bourbon, king of Sicily

In 1759 Charles agreed to take the vacant seat on the throne of Spain, thus having to renounce that of Sicily and Naples to comply with international treaties prohibiting their union. In his place was appointed his son Ferdinand III of Sicily and IV of Naples, who also retained the title of Infante of Spain and was entrusted to the guardianship of a regency council, with the task of both administering public affairs until the young ruler came of age and providing for his education, although directives continued to be sent by Charles from Spain.

In 1768, he took Maria Carolina of Austria as his wife, but the dissimilarities between the two were obvious: he, uncouth and uncultured, she, elegant, well-educated and shrewd to the point that she would have the upper hand over her husband, even politically. Maria Carolina noted that the young consort was totally uninformed, to the point that:

Esteeming Sicily as much as Capri or Procida, he would have been able, between the lack of enlightenment and the haste to move on to kill a gazette, to grant that kingdom as a fief to any of his henchmen.

— Maria Carolina of Austria

Like his father, he also attempted to reform Sicilian laws, but failed against baronial power: on September 19 and 20, 1773, there was a popular insurrection in Palermo, which broke out because of the death of the president of the city's Senate, Cesare Caetani, prince of Cassaro. The rioters stormed the Vicariate Palace and the Royal Palace. Between September and October, the revolt, led by the artisan guilds, inflamed the city and nearby Monreale, Piana dei Greci and Bisacquino. The barons took advantage of this situation and stirred up the masses to show the government that, in the absence of their approval, it was impossible to govern Sicily. Although there was no intention to take the island away from the ruling house, the Palermo Revolution can be considered to all intents and purposes a political uprising, instigated and fomented by the local ruling class, having the goal of crushing the reformist policy.

== Sicily in the Napoleonic Wars ==
In 1789 the French Revolution broke out, aimed at destroying the Ancien régime. This sparked unrest and conflict throughout Europe based on whether or not to accept the new principles proposed by the French. Most European monarchs railed against such liberal ideologies and opposed revolutionary France, which had officially declared war on absolutism since 1792. This was the context in which Corsican general Napoleon Bonaparte took his first steps. At first the various autonomous entities closest to France, such as those in northern Italy, fell into his power. Many sister republics were then established, dependent on the will of the French.

As early as April 1798, Napoleon had ordered his general Louis Charles Antoine Desaix to drop anchor in Syracuse (or in some of the Syracusan roadsteads) and await the arrival of the French Army, which was to sail from Toulon (Desaix was instead to arrive in Syracuse from the conquered Latian city of Civitavecchia); thereafter, Napoleon would send another dispatch to Desaix in which he warned him of his imminent arrival, so the French would have to leave the Sicilian city and go to the island of Malta to conquer it.

Napoleon Bonaparte's reason for wanting to anchor serenely near Syracuse was the existence of a neutrality treaty that the Bourbon cities had pledged to maintain in the Revolutionary Wars: the Treaty of Paris of October 1796 (ratified by the Armistice of Brescia). Nonetheless, the presence of the French Army in Sicilian waters, noted since May of that year, caused great turmoil: numerous foreign powers offered their alliance to King Ferdinand III, not trusting Napoleon's plans at all; all of them convinced that his target was Sicily (to which it should be added that since the fall of the Venetian Republic, the Venetian fleet had been placed in the service of the French and was dangerously cruising in the Syracusan sea).

In the last days of May, Napoleon Bonaparte approached the port of Syracuse on board French warships, but pulled out, took his squadron to the gates of Malta and issued an ultimatum to the Knights of John, who, being mostly of French origin, offered little resistance and surrendered the island to France.

Thus, wandering again, the Order headed to Russia, seeking help. After occupying the island, Napoleon lifted anchor to land in July 1798 at Abū Qīr Bay in Alexandria, Egypt.

=== The violation of the neutrality treaty; the landing of England's fleet ===
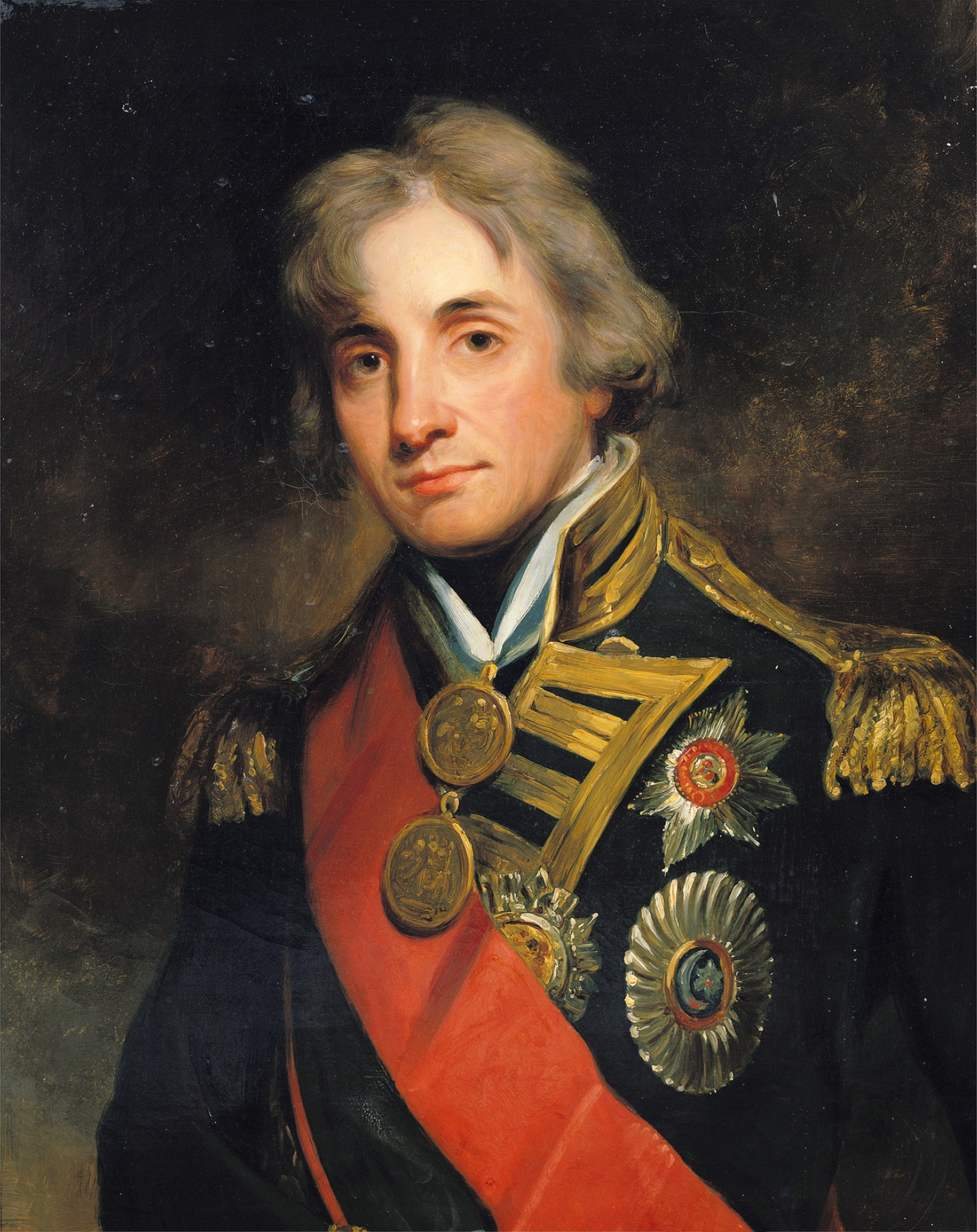
Admiral Horatio Nelson

While the French were preparing to conquer the pyramids, Admiral Horatio Nelson landed in Syracuse on July 19 with England's fleet, frantically searching for Napoleon.

Nelson's landing in Sicily was by no means easy: the British, to whom France had long since declared a bitter war, openly reciprocated by Great Britain, had been sailing for more than a month in the Mediterranean Sea, without being able to track down Napoleon's ships (who had every interest in avoiding a clash at sea with the more experienced rival crews); Nelson had learned of the capture of Malta while enquiring near the coast of Naples on June 17: he then reached the coast of Messina on June 20, where he received information to head for the Aegean Sea; sensing Napoleon's eastern plan, and having given his own fleet a great boost, Nelson brushed past and overtook the French ships at Crete without realizing it.

Arriving in Alexandria he did not find the enemy, and fearing that Napoleon had decided to attack Sicily, he decided to turn back, go to Syracuse and from there take stock of the situation.

However, once he approached the Sicilian coast, he was not allowed to enter the port: Syracuse, in fact, was bound by the aforementioned neutrality pact between Ferdinand III of Bourbon and France. It was only with the intervention of Emma Hamilton (wife of the British ambassador to Naples, Sir William Hamilton, and confidant of Queen Maria Carolina of Habsburg-Lorraine) that Nelson obtained permission from the city's government to land, despite the fact that this meant a violation of the Bourbon neutrality treaty with the French.

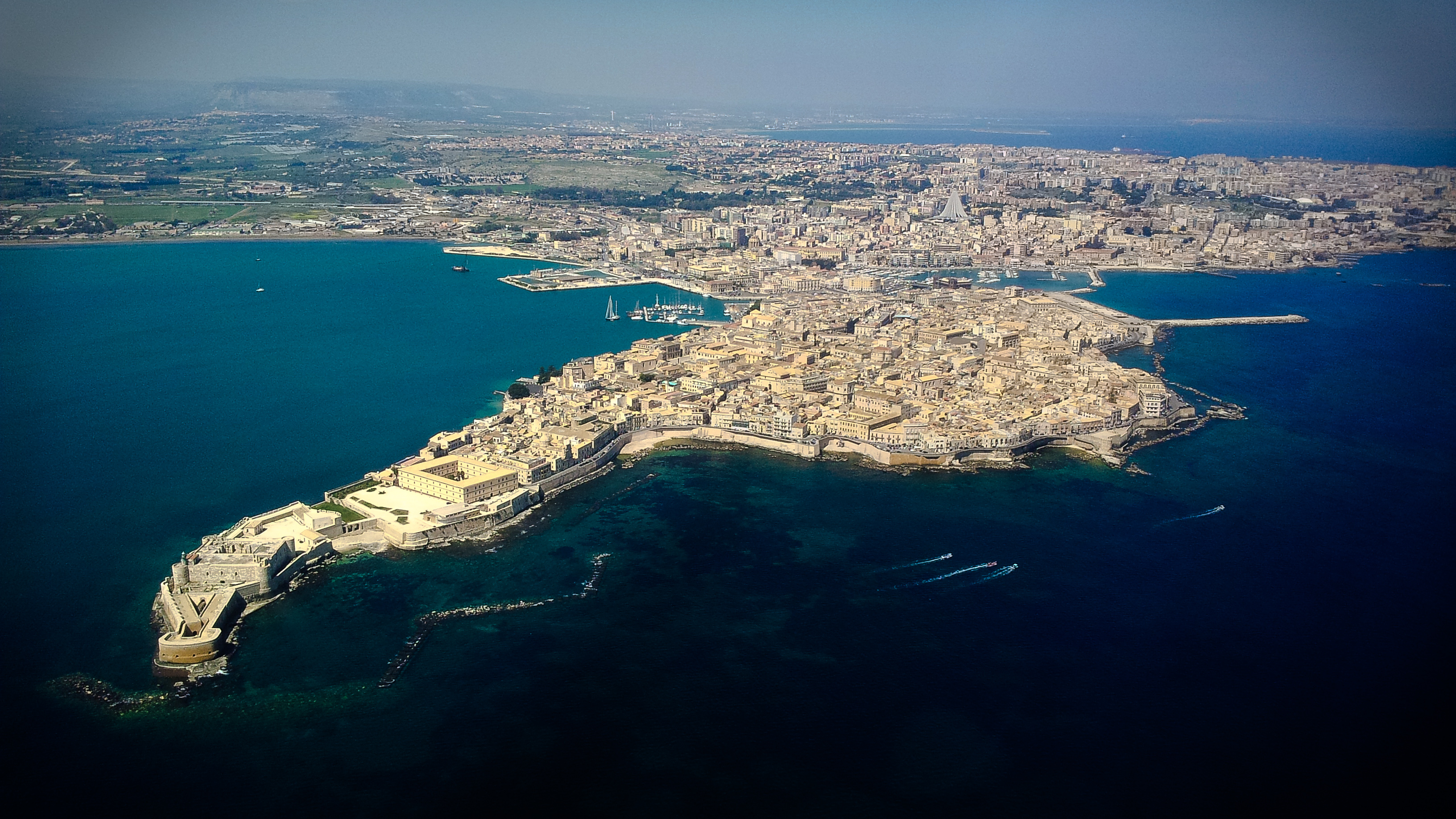
Today's port city of Syracuse (Nelson's former landing place) as seen from above

Horatio Nelson would recall Emma's intercession as a fact of vital importance, (Note: ...Secondly: the British Fleet under my command could never have returned the second time to Egypt, had not Lady HAMILTON'S influence with the Queen of Naples caused letters to be wrote to the Governor of Syracuse, that he was to encourage the Fleet's being supplied with every thing, should they put into any port in Sicily. We put into Syracuse, and received every supply; went to Egypt, and destroyed the French Fleet: Could I have rewarded these services, I would not now call upon my Country [...] — Testament of Horatio Nelson drafted during the Battle of Trafalgar, October 21, 1805. Quoted in L' Europa durante il consolato e l'impero di Napoleone storia di Capefigue, vol. 5, 1842, p. 450, n. 1.) although according to numerous historians the actions of the more powerful John Acton were behind the violation; indeed there would also have existed an official document, signed by Acton on June 17, authorizing Nelson to supply himself in the ports of the Siculo-Italic Kingdom and more specifically those of Syracuse, Messina, Augusta, and Trapani. This, however, contrasts with the stark refusals the admiral claimed to have received in most ports on the island.

A few days after Nelson's departure from the Sicilian port, on August 1–2, 1798, the Battle of the Nile took place, in which the English rear admiral's fleet defeated its Napoleonic rival.

The French consul at the court of Naples, Monsieur La Cheze, in charge of Affairs for the Republic of France, presented Ferdinand's government with a note requesting the expulsion of John Acton and the surrender of the military governor of Syracuse into the hands of French justice; the two main culprits, according to Napoleon's entourage, (Note: See in this regard also the work written by Antoine de Jomini (who was part of Napoleon's General Staff), a military historian who narrates in the first person, as if he were Napoleon, the wartime events of that period: Vita politica e militare di Napoleone raccontata da lui medesimo al Tribunale di Cesare, Alessandro e Federigo. Tomo 1.[-4.]: 1.2, vol. 1, 1829, p. 320.) of the support obtained by Nelson.

France also demanded of Ferdinand that all ports in the Kingdom of Sicily come under French administration, which would no longer allow violations of the neutrality treaty. Napoleon later succeeded in obtaining Acton's removal from the Bourbons, but not control of the Sicilian ports.

=== The Bourbons find refuge in Palermo ===
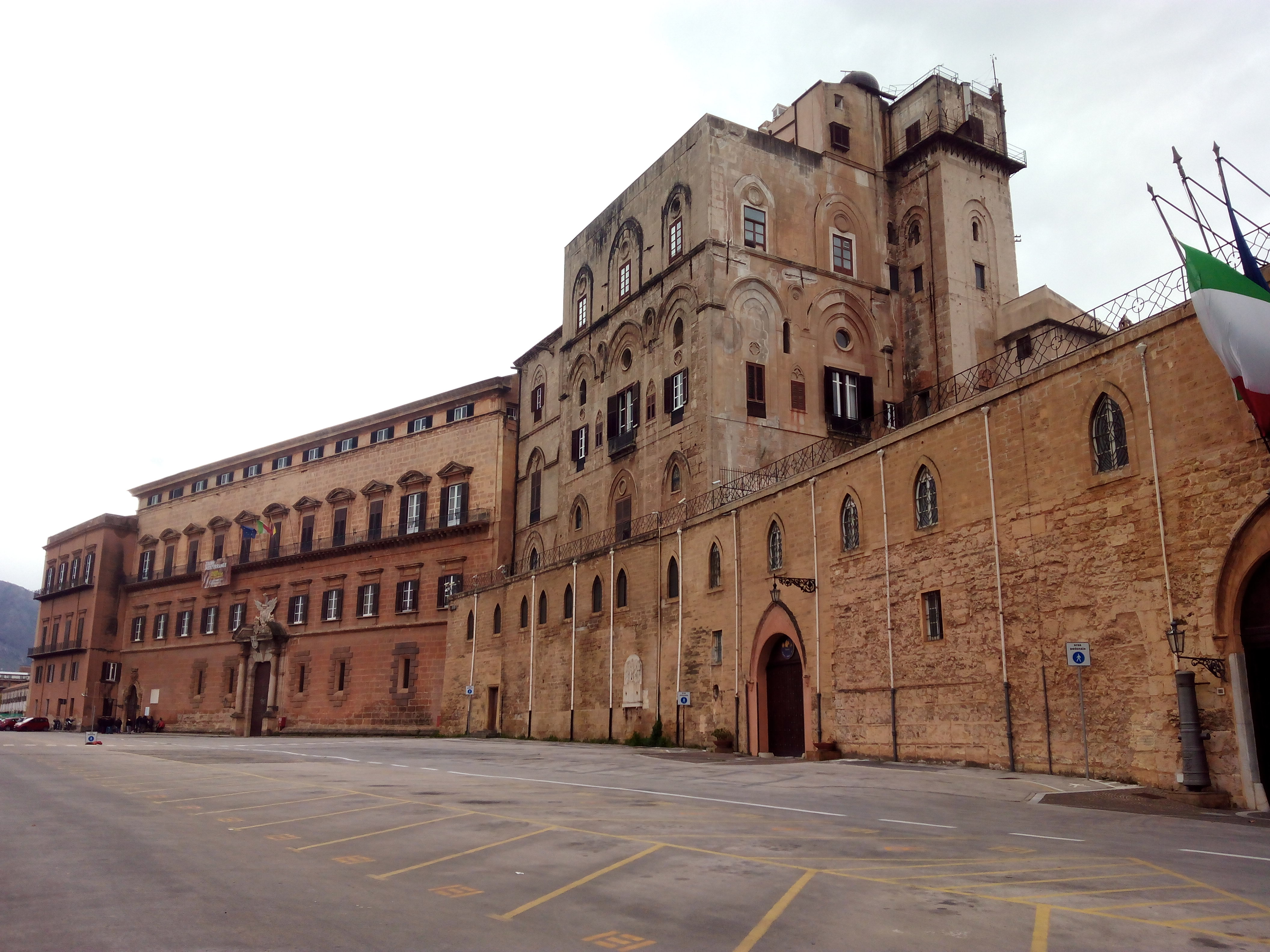
Norman Palace in Palermo, which became the seat of the Bourbon court when it had to flee Naples following Napoleon Bonaparte's conquest

In addition to the decisive logistical support given to Nelson, Ferdinand listened to England who urged him to invade the Papal States recently conquered by Napoleon, so that the rupture was total. At this point the French, believing the neutrality pact was now definitively violated, had no more scruples and invaded the continental part of the Bourbon Kingdom, forcing the king and queen to make a hasty escape. Horatio Nelson then led Ferdinand and Maria Carolina to Palermo on December 22, 1798.

The French had declared the crown of Naples forfeited: the Neapolitan Republic, which like its other sister republics was placed under French control, was established in its place in 1799. The Sicilians, initially satisfied with the assurances given by Ferdinand in the opening speech of the 1802 parliamentary session regarding his intention to keep the court in Palermo, granted the sovereign substantial donations. However, in 1802 the sovereigns were able to make a temporary return to the court in Naples, leaving the Palermo court vacant once again. The situation changed for the worse for the Bourbons when Napoleon Bonaparte further invaded their continental kingdom.

In September 1805 an attempt to retake the Kingdom of Naples had been made starting from the Sicilian city of Syracuse, from which an Anglo-Russian fleet consisting of 13,000 Russian and 7,000 British soldiers had sailed. The expedition finally failed because of the discordant views between the Russians and the British, who, unable to agree among themselves, granted the French an easy victory, returning themselves to Sicily in 1806.

Already on December 27, 1805, Napoleon Bonaparte, from Schönbrunn Palace, had condemned the Neapolitan Bourbon monarchy, declaring it no longer existent:

La dynastie de Naples a cessé de régner; son existence est incompatible avec le repos de l'Europe et l'honneur de ma couronne.
The dynasty of Naples has ceased to reign; its existence is incompatible with the rest of Europe and the honour of my crown.

In 1806 he established a new Kingdom of Naples, placed under the leadership of his brother Joseph Bonaparte. Sicily, which for the French was now theoretically included within their domains, due to the personal union between the continental and island crowns, in fact continued to be a possession of the Bourbon monarchy and remained under the protection of the British. Therefore, the Neapolitan rulers, for the second time, found refuge in the court of Sicily.

=== The English presence in the Kingdom of Sicily ===
Europe under the rule of France in 1812. Sicily was one of the very few European states that managed to avoid being incorporated into Napoleon's Empire

The British presence on the island – an armed presence with warlike purposes (the war on Napoleon Bonaparte) – would go down in Sicilian historiography as the "English decade."

Among the cities of Sicily, the British chose the strategic location of Syracuse as a suitable location to establish their anti-Napoleonic military strategy on the island: in fact, this city lent itself to this purpose, being a well-named place-of-arms for its defenses since 1679 (one of the few on the island), and from the very beginning of the second coming of the Bourbons to Palermo, it was brought, with the consent of the sovereigns, under the direct control of England. Syracuse, a stronghold, Palermo, seat of the court, and Messina, gateway to the European continent, were the three main strategic points closely guarded by His Britannic Majesty's soldiers.

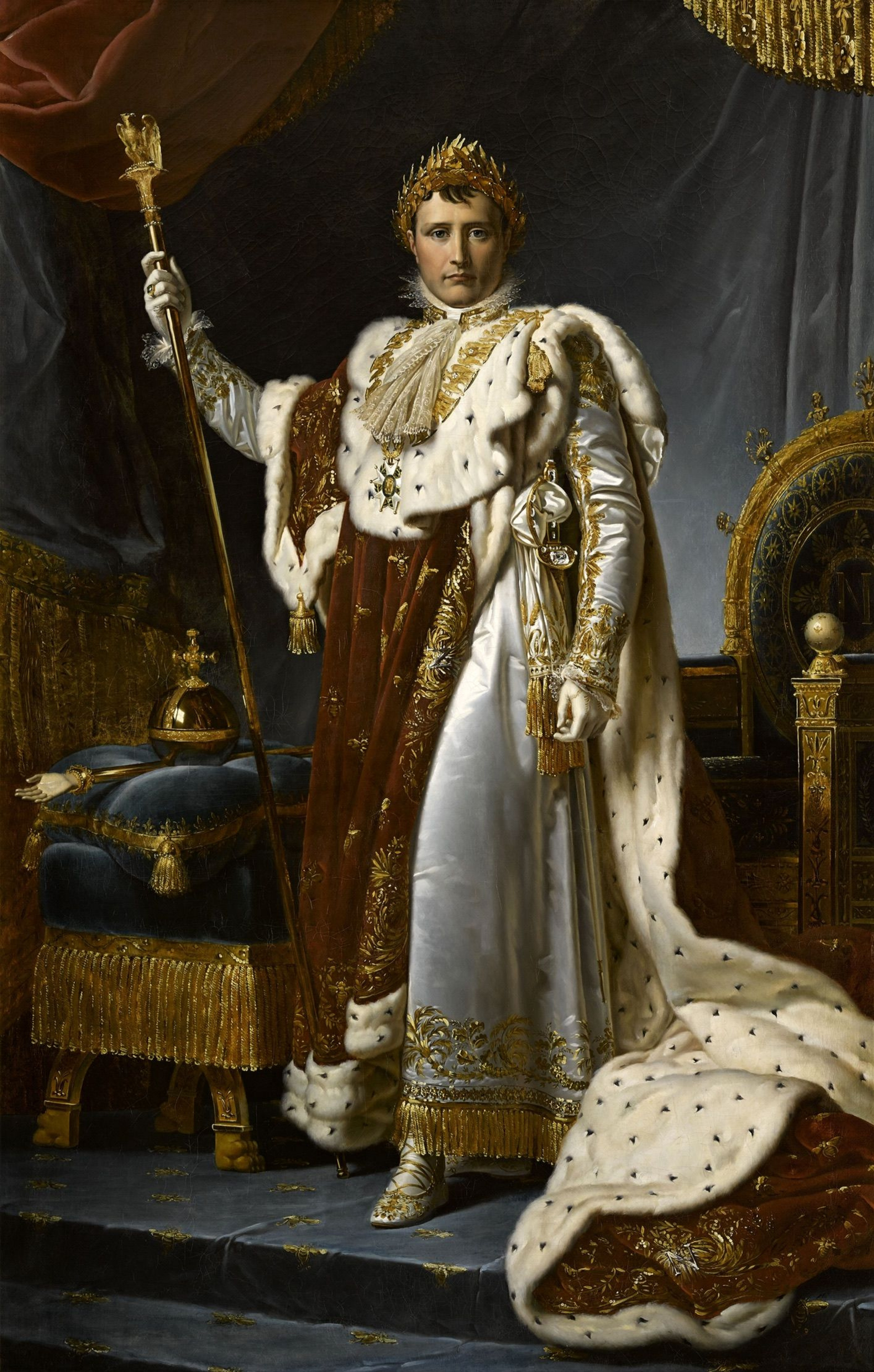
Napoleon Bonaparte, Emperor of the French (François Gérard, 1805)

Sicily in that decade became a home of salvation for many peoples: in addition to the Neapolitan court of the Bourbons, the Sicilian capital also represented a refuge for the future king of the French, Louis Philippe (exiled from France as a relative of the guillotined Louis XVI).

England continued to resist, and was joined, along with the Kingdom of Sicily, by the Portuguese Empire and the Kingdom of Sardinia. The largest island in the Mediterranean, in particular, represented the main defensive pivot for the British: Napoleon recalled in his memoir how the British used to enlist, often forcibly, mainly Sicilians (in addition to their Portuguese allies).

=== Napoleon Bonaparte: the taking of Sicily ===
It was in Napoleon's intentions to subject Sicily to his rule as well. Having dismissed the plan to invade Britain with an amphibious landing, he attempted, or rather planned, a first Sicilian invasion, finalized between 1806 and 1808 (there was later talk of a further plan to invade the island, in which, however, the Emperor of the French played an ambiguous role). Nonetheless, Napoleon Bonaparte seemed to have a dearth of information about the state of the Mediterranean island, evidence of which is the barrage of questions he asked his brother Joseph about everything related to Sicily, the answers to which were to enlighten the French, showing them how to move about in it.

Mon frère [...] mes escadres sont en mouvement, et qu'on peut d'un moment à l'autre passer en Sicile [...] le 25 ou le 30 l'amiral Ganteaume pût paraitre devant Reggio, débarquer mes troupes entre Catane et Messine, s'emparer Messine et meme de Catane, bloquer les forts, et enlever le Phare. Cette opération pourrait etre faite d'autant mieux, que l'amiral Ganteaume menacerait par là Syracuse, ce qui intriguerait beaucoup les Anglais.
My brother [...] my squadrons are on the move and we can enter Sicily at any moment [...] on the 25th or 30th Admiral Ganteaume could appear at Reggio, land my troops between Catania and Messina, take Messina and perhaps Catania, blockade the forts and occupy the lighthouse. This operation might be more successful as Admiral Ganteaume would threaten Syracuse, which would intrigue the British.

— Emperor Napoleon Bonaparte to his brother King Joseph Bonaparte of Naples, February 17, 1808.

One of his plans (Napoleon always proposed multiple solutions in his dispatches), was to land French troops, commanded by Admiral Honoré-Joseph-Antoine Ganteaume, between Messina and Catania and, after taking these two cities, march the French to Syracuse, "threatening" it with conquest, so as to agitate the British, since Napoleon knew that inside the city was the core of the British defense (he was convinced that the last resistance of the British on the island would focus on Syracuse).

He finally decided to postpone the landing until after the capture of Scilla (a Calabrian frontier under British control) had been secured. However, the Sicilian endeavor would remain central to his thoughts. One can understand how important he considered the conquest of Sicily to be from a quote he wrote in May 1806 (a time when he considered Europe to be pacified under his rule) to his brother Joseph: “la Sicile est tout, et Gaète n'est rien” ("Sicily is everything, and Gaeta is nothing"), intending to urge him with strong words not to concentrate his troops on the Neapolitan bulwark (which was threatened by the British; for him a positive factor, since it distracted England from Sicily, giving his army a chance to attempt landings), but rather to direct his gaze to the Sicilians, whose island, protected by his arch-enemies, the British, became crucial to stabilizing his conquests on the continent.

=== The arrival of Admiral Collingwood ===
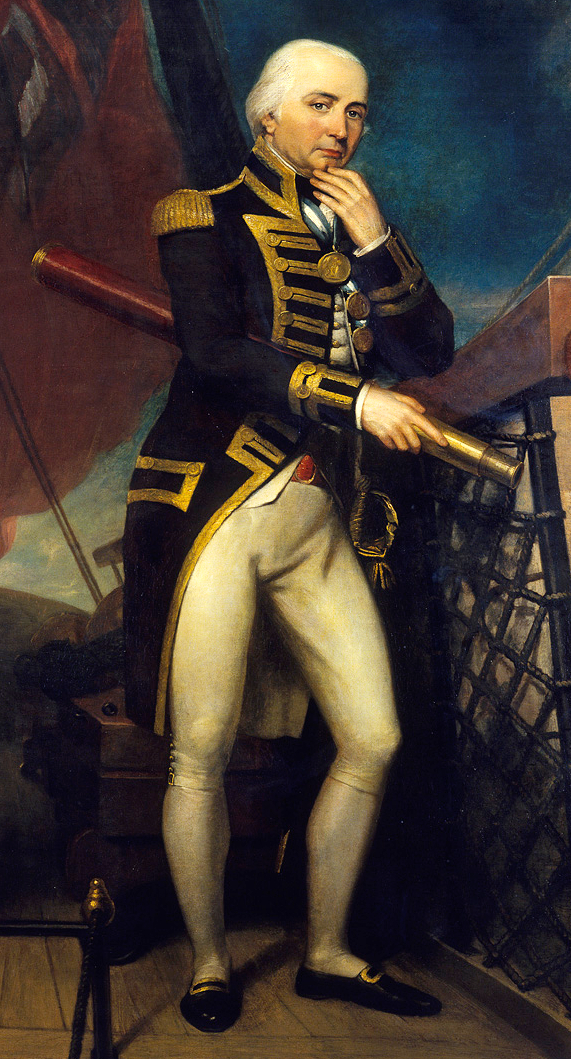
Cuthbert Collingwood, commander in chief of the Mediterranean Fleet

Royal Navy Admiral Cuthbert Collingwood – who had been linked to Nelson by a deep friendship; he was with him at Trafalgar and took his place in the command of the fleet when the latter was killed during the battle – wrote from Cadiz to Hugh Elliot, an English minister at Ferdinand's court, that for the survival of what remained of the Bourbon crown it was absolutely necessary that England be free to dispose of part of Sicily at its own will, without any restriction from the Neapolitan court implanted in Palermo; Collingwood's choice fell on Syracuse, which welcomed from day 6 of December 1807 the commander of the Mediterranean Fleet (the British Mediterranean fleet) with its warships.

Collingwood, although he showed sincere interest in the vicissitudes of the city that housed the command of his fleet, was actually there for other reasons, and when he wrote to Sir William Drummond of Logiealmond (British minister at the Bourbon court, Elliot's successor) that same day, he did so in very different tones, expressing the need for Britain to be able to count on the Sicilians to counter the expansionist ambitions of the French:

Syracuse is so particularly situated, and so much may depend on the exertion of its people, that I should conceive that a policy the reverse of diminisging its power, a policy to aggrandise it, to increase its population, and to attach them strongly, and by every means, to the true interests of their Country, would, in the course of events, be found hightly beneficial. They have an admirable port, but no trade; a beautiful country, but the badness of the roads makes it a desert.

— Cuthbert Collingwood to Sir William Drummond, January 13, 1808.

=== Effects of the Peace of Tilsit ===
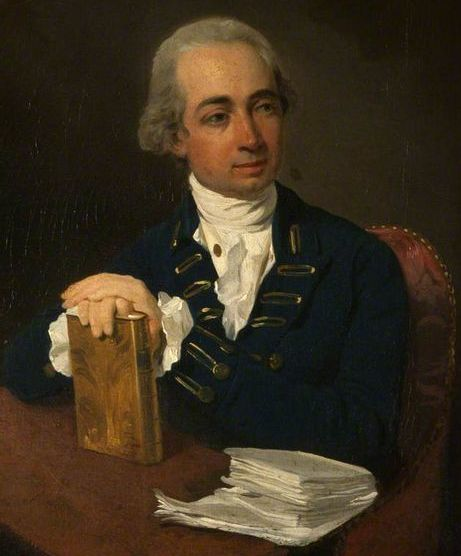
British Baron-Commander Cuthbert Collingwood

While Collingwood carefully guarded the Sicilian Sea, serious tensions occurred with the Russians: Collingwood had received orders from the British Admiralty in Syracuse since early January 1808 to destroy all Russian ships that were on the Sicilian coast.

This was the effect of the war that Russia had declared on Britain at the behest of Napoleon Bonaparte, who, in the previous year (summer 1807), had forced Tsar Alexander I into the peace of Tilsit (relations between the Russians and British, however, had already been strained since 1806). However, despite pressure from Robert Adair (British plenipotentiary to the Habsburg-Lorraine court in Vienna) and the command of the Lordships, Collingwood struggled to perform what was required of him, as he glimpsed, even at that time, the rifts that would later lead to a final break between Napoleon and Alexander. The British admiral, aboard his Ocean, from the port of Syracuse stated:

The Emperor Alexander has acted unwisely; without gaining a friend in the world, he has drawn on himself the contempt, and perhaps the hatred, of his subjects. He should have known that Buonaparte has no passion but ambition, no friend but such as can be made subservient to his aggrandisement. Having gained his object, he no longer cares for him, and by this time is ready to go to war with him upon the smallest difference.

— Cuthbert Collingwood to Alexander Ball, governor of Malta. Syracuse, January 27, 1808.

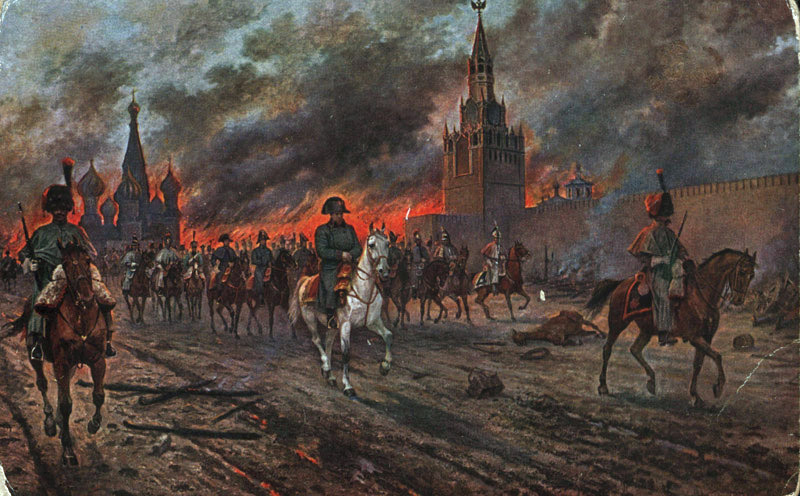
Napoleon and the French leave the burned-out Moscow in 1812

Until 1807 Russian ships had docked quietly in Sicilian ports. In the Aretusean city, for example, docked in 1806 the Russian warship in which the young naval officer Vladimir Bogdanovič Bronevsky (author of the book Memoirs of a Russian naval officer during the campaign in the Mediterranean Sea from 1805 to 1810), (Note: Original language title: Zapiski morskogo oficera v prodolženii kampanii na Sredizemnom more.) was traveling, whose testimony was significant in the cultural milieu of his homeland, as it represented for the Russians one of the rare open windows to the Sicilian world.

By the time Collingwood prepared to implement the directives he had received from Britain (pointing out, however, that the actions of the British navy against the Russians in Sicily were a clear violation of that country's neutrality with the tsar and a heavy interference with the Sicilian crown) it was already too late, as the Russian ships had left the Sicilian navies en masse (except for those still in Palermo, which were forcibly detained). Destruction therefore did not occur, but there grew a strong suspicion regarding the Russians' intentions over Sicily. Syracuse began to be specially guarded in this war.

... Now the Russian squadron of Sienowizrode [Dmitry Nikolaevich Senjavin] is entering Sicily: a ship has entered Syracuse and explored the harbour. Although they could have been useful to us, we wished they had never come [...].

— Ferdinand IV of Bourbon's ambassador to the court of St Petersburg, Antonino Maresca, denounces the Peace of Tilsit.

Tilsit was important to Napoleon, as the tsar pledged to abide by the Berlin Decree (Nov. 21, 1806), i.e., the strict Continental Blockade imposed on England (which in Europe could thus trade only with Sicily, Portugal and Sardinia). But Alexander I broke the peace with Napoleon because Napoleon showed that he did not want to cede control over the Dardanelles Strait, the Bosporus and the city of Constantinople to him (in essence, Russia wanted free access to the center of the Mediterranean, which Napoleon, despite being the tsar's ally, did not grant, greatly displeasing Alexander). Before beginning hostilities against the Russians – the Russian campaign – Napoleon asked England for peace: he could then consider himself satisfied, since he had defeated both the Fourth and Fifth Coalitions.

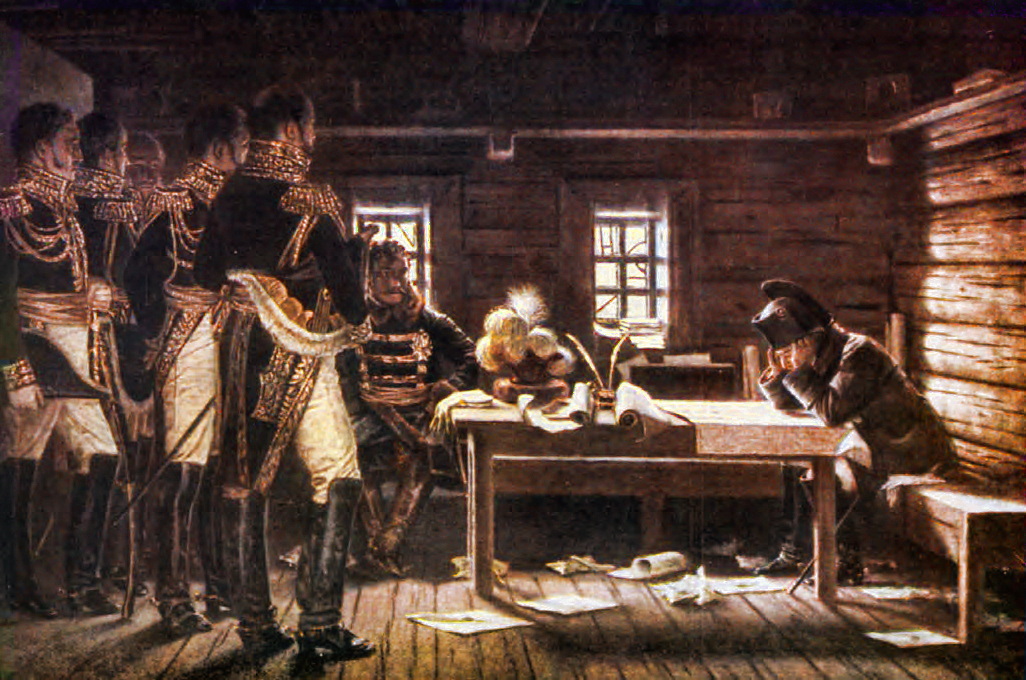
Napoleon with his generals during the disastrous retreat. Frost was instrumental in the defeat of the Grande Armée in Russia.

What he demanded of the British was to give up Sicily (which would remain at Bonaparte's behest to the Bourbons), Portugal and the rebellion in Spain; the French in turn would lay down their arms in the same countries (Paris, April 17, 1812). Lord Castlereagh's response was that Britain would not tolerate any crowns in the hands of the Bonaparte family. The peace negotiations therefore broke down. Sicily continued to be occupied by the British. (Note: The previous attempt at peace between Napoleon and the British had taken place shortly before the Peace of Tilsit in 1806: Napoleon had entered into negotiations with the British minister Charles James Fox; they had almost succeeded in reaching an agreement, but it was Sicily and the island of Malta that broke it off: At first, Napoleon had decided to give up their conquest and keep only Northern Italy and the Kingdom of Naples for his family; England seemed to accept these conditions, since it remained a hegemonic party in the center of the Mediterranean, but later Napoleon, having made the pact with Russia and feeling stronger with his new ally, told the English that Sicily had to be evacuated and Malta had to be returned to the Knights Hospitaller. England, not trusting his intentions, did not evacuate the island and the war continued.)

"If this fourth attempt at peace fails, as those that preceded it have failed, France will at least have the consolation of knowing that the blood about to flow again will all fall on England."

— Napoleone Bonaparte.

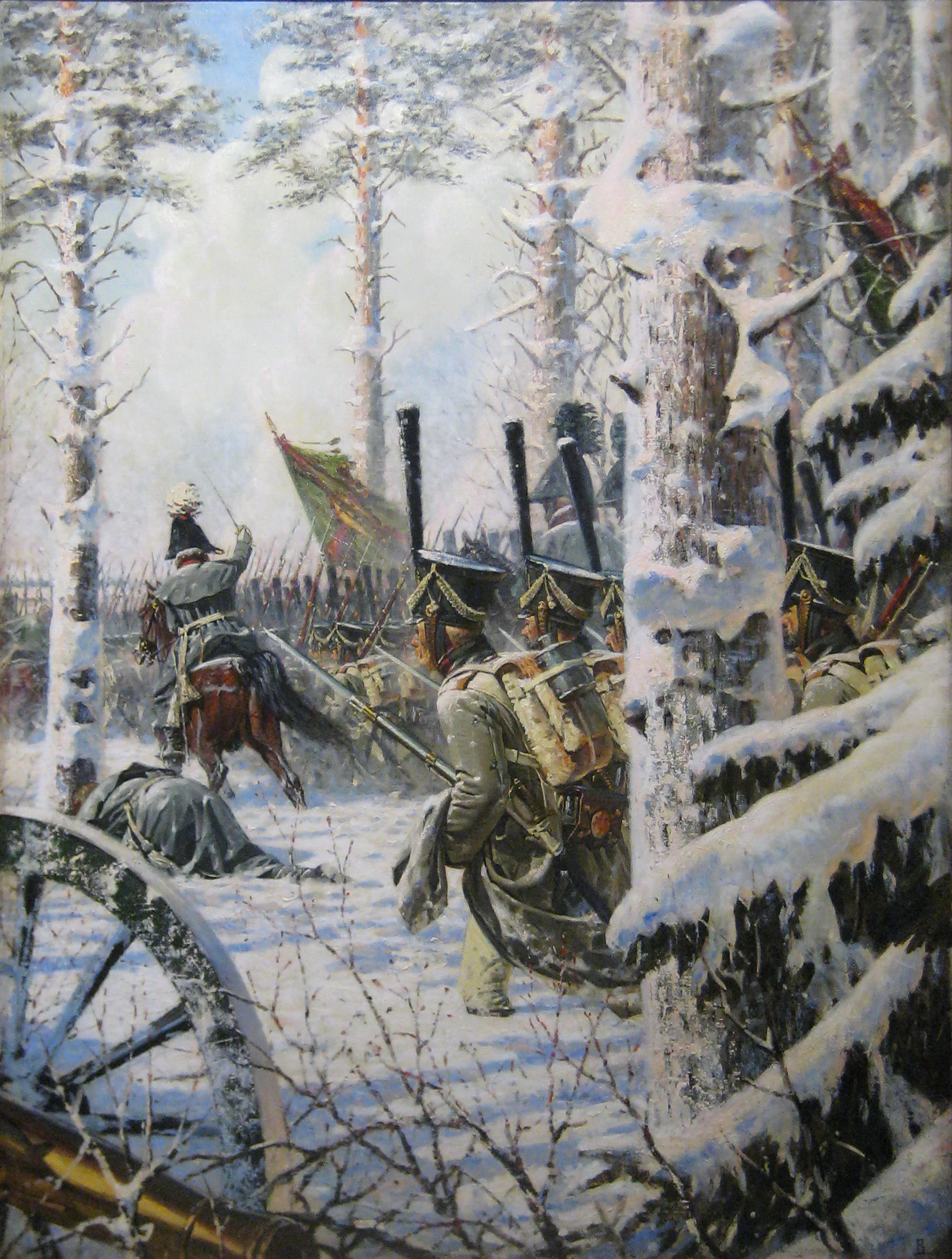
Napoleon leads his men in one of the last attacks on Russian soil

The inhabitants of the city of Syracuse were exempt from the forced enlistment carried out by the British directly in the provincial territory: the British could recruit even the royal soldiers and officers of Sicily, and they had full powers over the natives in certain areas they occupied, which also included the settlements around the capital of Syracuse as far as Capo Passero, which marked the demarcation line within which Brigadier General John Stuart had total military freedom on land (full powers over the navy, on the other hand, belonged to Sir Cuthbert Collingwood). The erudite Saverio Landolina observed that the forced departure of so many young Sicilians for war on the continent poisoned the island's air. Nevertheless, there were also Sicilians who could independently choose which battalions to join; several of them chose to serve Napoleon's France rather than the Bourbon crown or the English cause.

=== Sicily as an English protectorate ===
==== Scotsman Gould Francis Leckie ====
As Napoleon's campaign of conquest in the distant Russian and Germanic lands unfolded, the relationship with England in Sicily began to change: from a momentary and simple military occupation, there began to be talk from many quarters of a possible permanent stay of the English on the Mediterranean island.

In September 1810 Bonaparte's brother-in-law, Joachim Murat, who had become king of Naples in place of Joseph Bonaparte (who had been awarded the Spanish crown by Napoleon), attempted – without having the authorization of the emperor of the French – to land in Sicily. This proved unsuccessful, but greatly alarmed the British, who, as a precautionary measure, increased their strength in Syracuse and Augusta; convinced that Murat's next assault would be directed against one of these two sea lands. Cultural contact between the natives and the occupiers therefore grew, and as political tensions matured throughout the island, the Sicilian question, that is, its fate when the long war would finally come to an end, struck a chord with the British government thanks largely to the circulation of a book, Historical survey of the foreign affairs of Great Britain, written and published in London in 1808 (and republished in 1810) by a Scottish military man and landowner named Gould Francis Leckie, who had lived from 1801 to 1807 in the Aretusean fief of Tremilia, which he had leased, by emphyteusis.

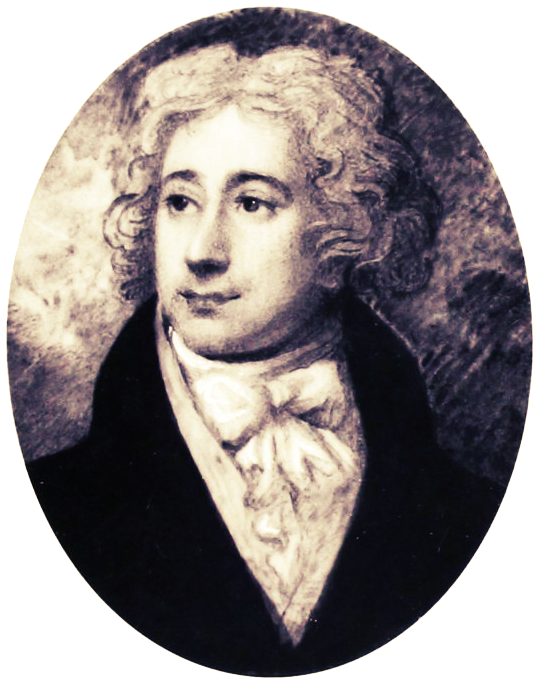
Gould Francis Leckie, who lived in Syracuse during the time of the Napoleonic empire and insisted that Britain become one with Sicily

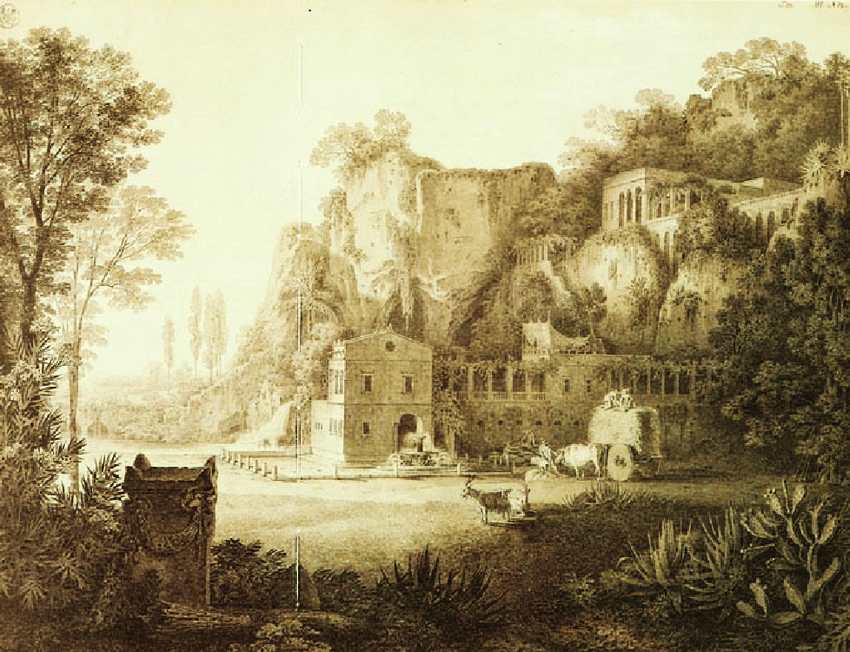
Landhaus bei Syrakus (Country house near Syracuse) by Karl Friedrich Schinkel: the German artist engraved Gould Francis Leckie's villa in Tremilia (Note: More recent views of the mansion that belonged to Gould Francis Leckie: veduta I, veduta II.)

The Scotsman wished to transplant the Anglo-Saxon agrarian model to the Syracuse area, starting with his own land. Leckie forged close relations with the Syracusans to such an extent that he asked to join the city's “mastra nobile” (governing body), which was not granted to him, as the local nobles viewed his meddling in Aretusian politics with suspicion.

Gould Francis Leckie managed to become a veritable “gray eminence" among the British military on the island; even hosting U.S. soldiers, who were in the city at the time (U.S. officer Stephen Decatur called the villa in Tremilia "idyllic," with its view overlooking the Syracusan bay), repeatedly expressing his thoughts aimed at creating a British protectorate over Sicily to Britain's high commands. He was appointed honorary consular agent of the United Kingdom for the city of Syracuse.

To his text (largely drafted while he was still residing in his Syracuse villa) is attributed the leap forward made by the British regarding their interest on the island's governmental status. England and France had declared themselves an “Ideological war,” as well as a physical war, in which English conservatives clashed with French revolutionaries. Leckie openly suggested to his nation's government to fight Napoleon, taking advantage of Sicily, not with arms but with politics: have the Sicilians start a counter-revolutionary movement; spread it to Italy and undermine the stability of the Napoleonic Code that its founder was imposing on the conquered countries.

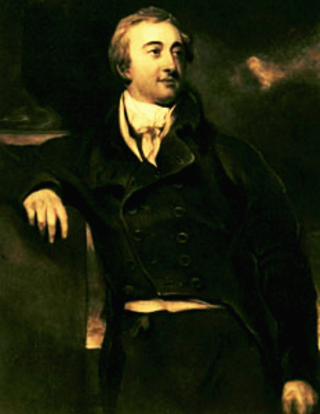
Lord William Bentinck, who arrived in Sicily and sentenced the Bourbon court: “constitution or revolution.” He personally campaigned in 1813 in favor of England among the Sicilians

To do this, however, a real reform was needed in the Sicilian Parliament: a Sicilian constitution had to be created, which, for Leckie, should not only be based on the model of the constitution of the United Kingdom but should be directly drafted by the English and strictly enforced on the natives (Leckie had no confidence in the Sicilian administration, which he called perverse). The Scot then worked out for his countrymen what was called an "island strategy" aimed at creating a "British empire of the islands," with which to defeat French expansion: Britain already possessed the island of Malta and the Ionian Islands (it had also strategically owned both Corsica and the island of Elba); the island of Sicily, the true center of the Mediterranean, Leckie argued, currently occupied militarily, was to become a permanent part of the British possessions.

After various constitutional discussions, Lord William Bentinck then arrived in the summer of 1811: commander-in-chief of the British forces of Sicily, brigadier general in the army of Arthur Wellesley, 1st Duke of Wellington and minister plenipotentiary at the Bourbon court in Palermo. Bentinck initially espoused only part of Leckie's thinking: he believed a constitution was necessary, but he wanted it to be drafted by the Sicilians and not the British. He also did not, at that time, speak of annexing the island to Great Britain, but he would eventually come, in order to accomplish the goals England had set for itself with Sicily, to sacrifice the present king and queen of the kingdom.

=== The contrasts between the Bourbons and the British ===
The sovereigns' forced sojourn on the island represented, in part, an opportunity for rapprochement between the people of Sicily and their almost unknown rulers, but this relationship was heavily marked by the English presence: the occupied city of Syracuse represented, for example, one of the main reasons for the rift between the Sicilian court and the English government: ever since Cuthbert Collingwood effectively took the eastern part of the island from the Bourbons' control, the Bourbons understood that England was a dangerous protecting power for them.

Especially it was Queen Maria Carolina of Austria – once benevolent to the overseas ally – who most resented the new attitude. (Note: Here is exactly what Cuthbert Collingwood told Hugh Elliot about the need to militarily separate Syracuse from Bourbon control: The court of Palermo should not be given a free hand to do what seemed necessary to protect the rest of its territories from further plunder. The royals of Naples could only save themselves from total ruin by making it impossible for them to act on their own. — Cuthbert Collingwood.) Lord William Bentinck came into sharp conflict with Habsburg-Lorraine, because he saw her as the main obstacle for English policy to be implemented in the island.

The queen was not resigned to Britain's overwhelming power over her kingdom; Ferdinand IV appeared indifferent to British moves, but not Maria Carolina. Sicily was militarily divided in two: in the western part were the Neapolitan soldiers: Palermo, Termini, Corleone, Carini; while the eastern part was commanded by the British army: Messina, Milazzo, Augusta, Syracuse. The royal family saw its crown powers halved, and this greatly annoyed Ferdinand's consort.

The queen's position precipitated when Napoleon Bonaparte forged a strong kinship with her: going on to marry in 1810 the daughter of the Austrian emperor Marie Louise of Habsburg-Lorraine, that is, the granddaughter of Maria Carolina of Austria and Ferdinand IV of Bourbon (born of their eldest daughter Maria Theresa Bourbon of Naples and Sicily).

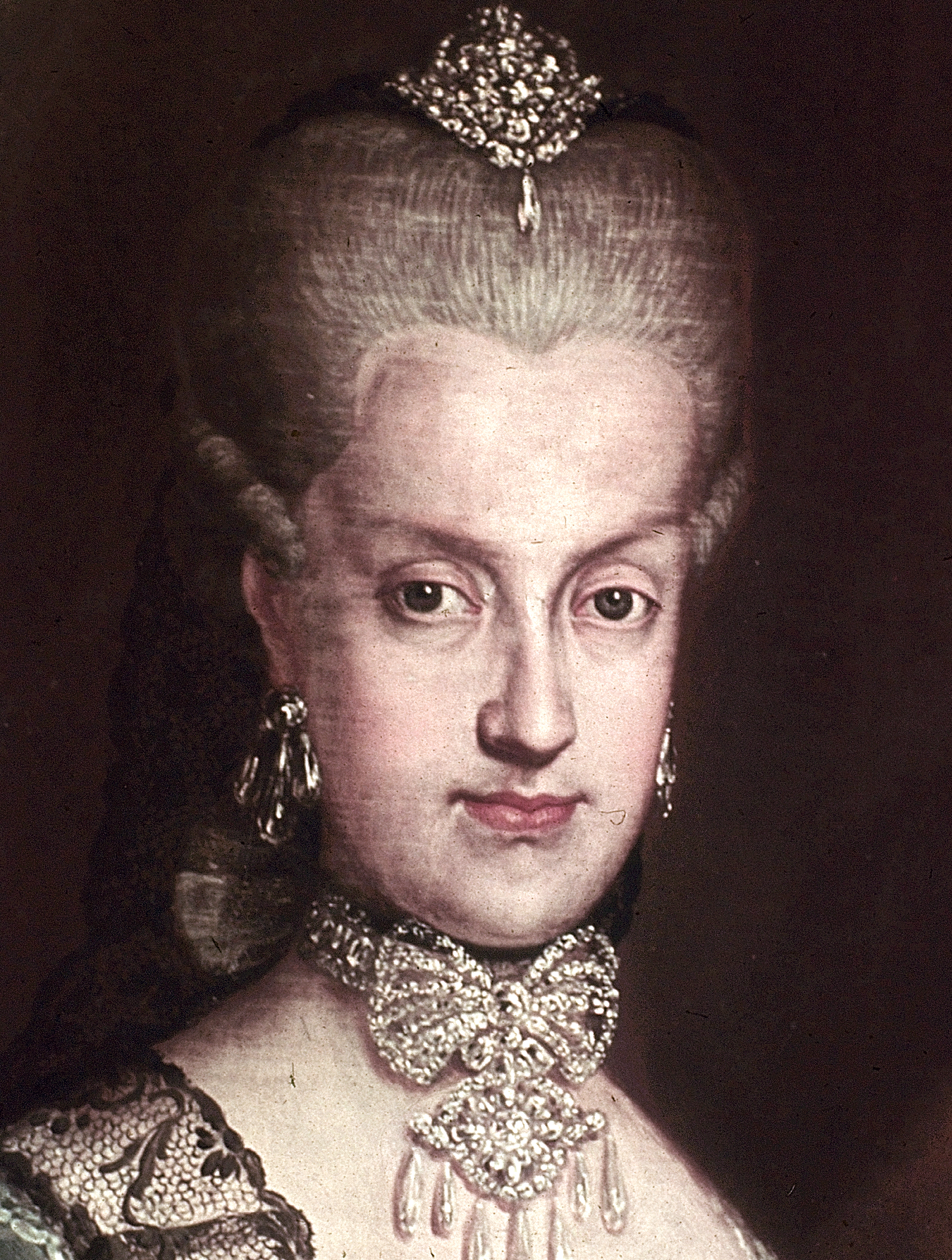
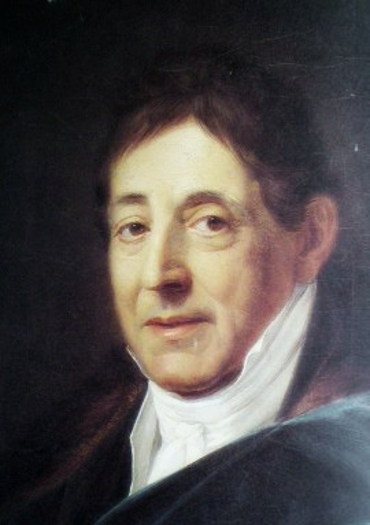
Queen of Sicily Maria Carolina of Austria and the Marquis of Syracuse Tommaso Gargallo: he wished to restore the Royal Chamber of Syracuse by placing the Habsburg-Lorraine at its head.

Maria Carolina was even blamed for the attempted landing in Sicily by Joachim Murat (King of Naples and brother-in-law of Napoleon Bonaparte): the British claimed that she agreed with Napoleon to have the French invade the Kingdom and hand over the Sicilian crown to his new nephew: it was also said that Napoleon boycotted Murat because he no longer wanted to attack his relative's subjects. (Note: Napoleon, for his part, would say in his memoirs that after the first son he had by the niece of the Sicilian queen, it was his right to hope for another son and to leave to this second son the throne of Sicily and Naples, and then to unite it with the rest of Italy. See Barry Edward O'Meara, Napoleone in esilio, 1844, p. 103.) Nevertheless, before 1810, relations between the Sicilian sovereign and the emperor of the French were by no means good (Maria Carolina, speaking of her new grandson-in-law, namely Napoleon, asserted that she had to resign herself to becoming the “grandmother of the devil.”).

Beyond that, England's great fear was that the Sicilians, tired of the two rulers, seen as tyrants, would declare the Republic and give themselves over to the French. Lord William Bentinck therefore assessed as necessary the forced removal of the queen and the abdication of Ferdinand's throne.

In this context, the work done by the Syracusan Tommaso Gargallo should be noted, who was at the center of a “resounding prohibition” imposed on one of his sonnets criticizing the submission of his sovereigns to the British; comparing the monarchy to a hanged man whose rope was in the hands of Britain. Gargallo was immediately joined by an emissary from the Neapolitan court, who ordered him to withdraw copies of the offending sonnet, and avoid displeasing the king and the British with those words (the prohibition, however, made it even easier for the sonnet to be circulated).

Maria Carolina of Austria, who had the reputation of being a tyrant and an unscrupulous woman (hers were the orders by which the massacre of the Neapolitan republicans in 1799, carried out with the connivance of Horatio Nelson, was authorized), ended up being accused by Lord William Bentinck of "connivance with the enemy," and in 1813, after strong English pressure, she chose the path of exile in Austria. She died just a year after her departure from Sicily.

Meanwhile, King Ferdinand, whom Bentinck had forced to abdicate (officially Ferdinand had said he was ill and thus forced by ill health to retire) to complete the Sicilian constitution in 1812, giving the powers of the alter ego to the son of the ruler Francis I, had embarked on a love affair with the Sicilian noblewoman Lucia Migliaccio, 12th duchess of Floridia and princess of Partanna (a title derived from her first marriage to Prince Grifeo, whose widow she remained): (Note: Lucia was the daughter of Vincenzo Migliaccio and Bonanno (Dukes of Floridia, ancient Syracusan nobles who were also related to the rulers of Spain) and Dorotea Borgia and Rau (Marquises of Casale, noble families that had been implanted in the Syracuse area; Dorotea was originally from Spain). Lucia was born in 1770 in the palace of the Borgia del Casale family.) the two were married in November 1814, in great secrecy, in Palermo, just two months after Maria Carolina's death, to the strong disapproval of Francis I (which gave rise to all the accusations of libertinism circulating about the Syracusan woman), who never accepted Lucia's entry into the royal family. Their marriage was morganatic (that is, she was not granted the right to the throne).

=== The evolution of relations with Britain ===
Bentinck meanwhile expressed a willingness to spread the newly adopted constitutional principles among the Sicilians, although, as pointed out by several historians, “acts and words of a somewhat mysterious, somewhat ambiguous sense were seen in him, so as to arouse suspicion of England's more ambitious and hidden aims in Sicily.”

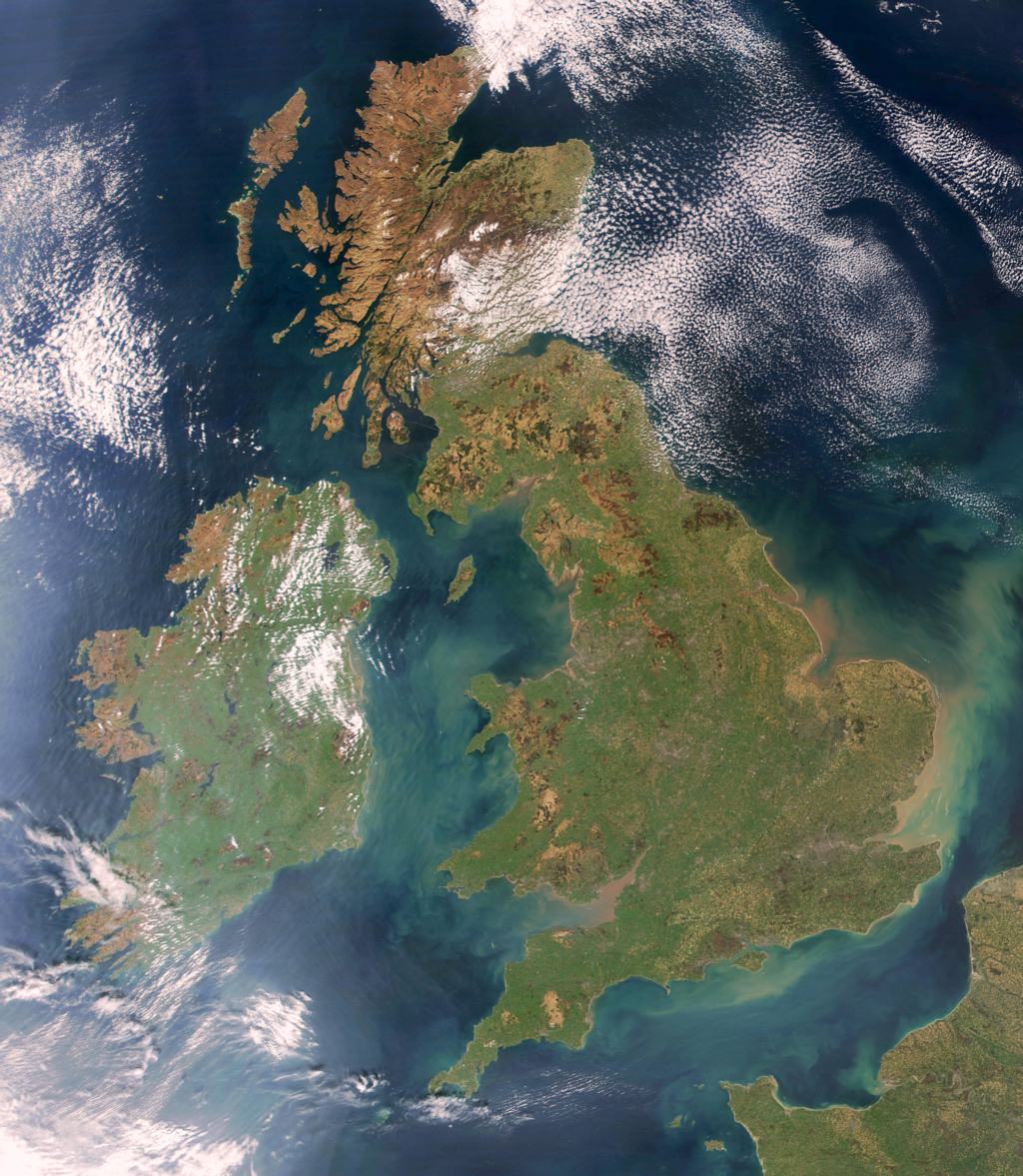
England, Scotland and Ireland as seen from a satellite. Military man Charles Pasley wanted Sicily annexed to the United Kingdom: he considered it the “second most beautiful island in the world,” (the British Ireland being the first)

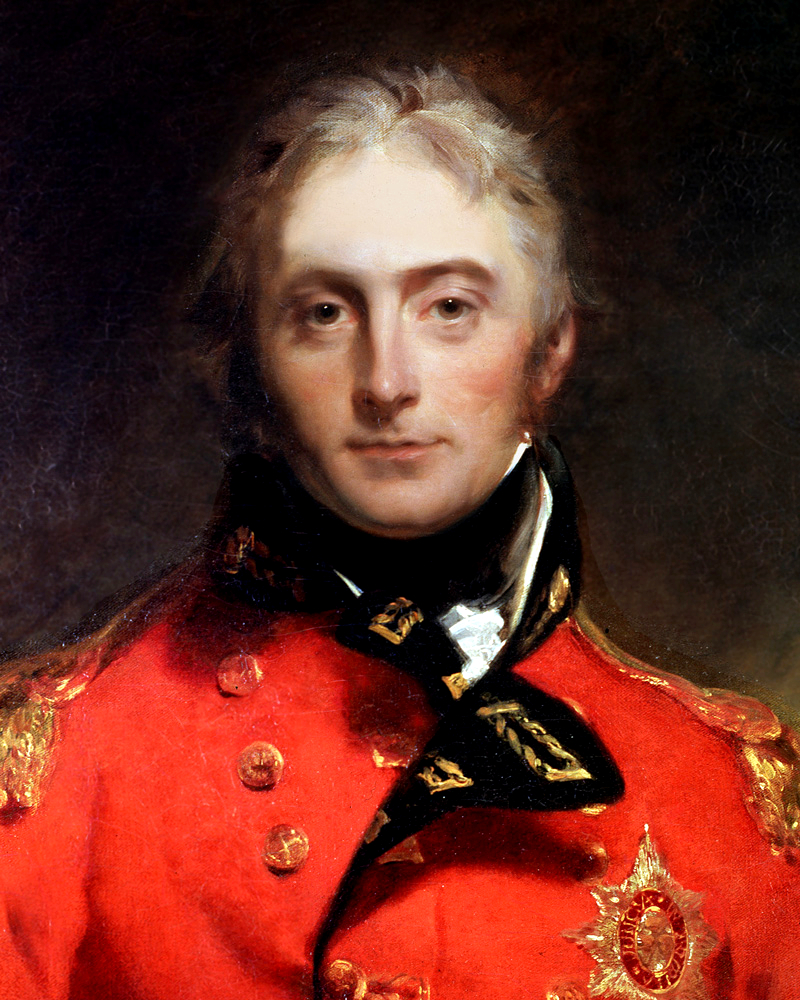
General John Moore (killed at the Battle of La Coruña against the French in 1809), wanted to annex Sicily to Great Britain.

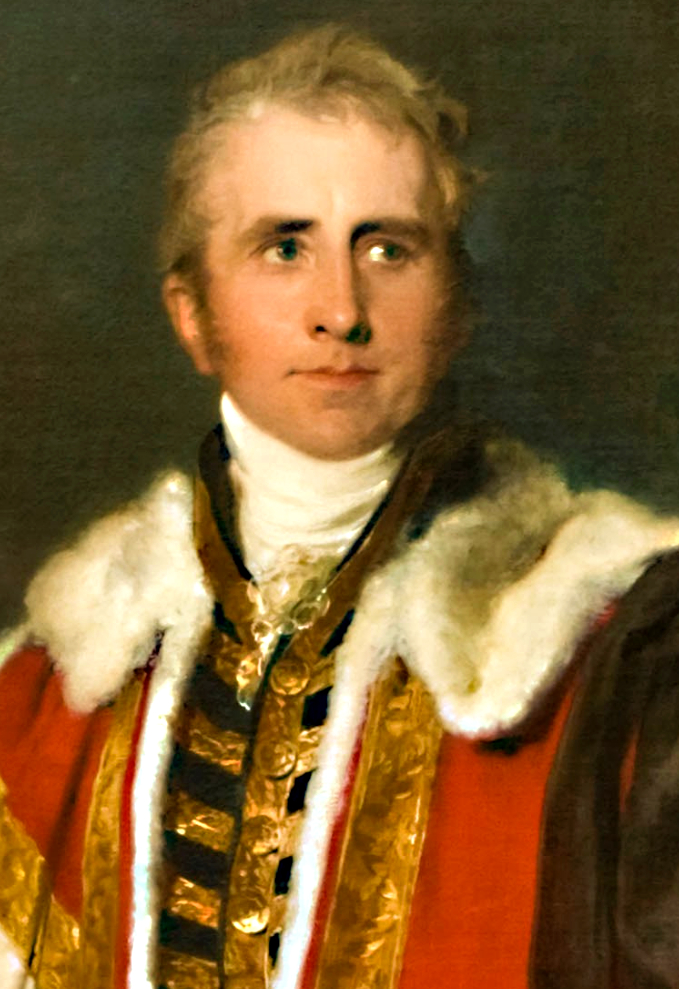
Lord William Pitt Amherst (future Governor-General of India) believed that the annexation of Sicily should only happen in an extreme case.

Bentinck in those days was seen as a "dictator" (because of the queen's exile and the king's estrangement from Sicilian affairs). There was a strong suspicion that his “petit voyage” (as Aceto calls it; among the most ardent constitutionalists of 1812) had as its purpose not the incitement of the island's freedom, but rather the preparation of the people for the eventual necessary annexation of their land to the nation across the channel that protected it. Suspicions erupted into scandal when the crown prince made public a letter that the Lord had sent him as he was about to arrive in Syracuse (on December 3, 1813), in which he suggested that Francis I renounce Sicily; cede it to England and obtain monetary compensation in return.

Upon reaching the London government, the letter required an official denial from Lord Castlereagh, who had to reassure Francis I that the British were not there to conquer the island. However, Bentinck was not recalled, as the Bourbons – deeply troubled by the unfolding situation – would have wished, and he, while unconvincingly specifying to the crown prince, that those words were only part of a "philosophical dream" of his, was able to reiterate clearly to Lord Castlereagh, on February 6, 1814, that the British had the opportunity to make Sicily "the most splendid gem in the crown of England; it would come soon after Ireland (whose Acts of Union were still vivid, having occurred in 1800). Nor were these words spoken solely by Lord William Bentinck, for even before him, other distinguished English figures dispatched from London to the island had expressed the same concept, wishing for annexation: it is worth mentioning in this regard the military engineer Charles Pasley, who with his writing An Essay on the Military Policy and Institutions of the British Empire (the first of its kind on geopolitics, in which it was stated, in clear terms, that England should annex Sicily to the United Kingdom) was together with the Scotsman Leckie the most influential promoter regarding the possible future of a Sicily united with the British Isles.

Also belonging to the same Sicilian interventionist period are General John Moore (then second-in-command) and Lord Amherst (William Pitt Amherst); who was Bentinck's imminent predecessor and the one who demanded more powers for the British in governing the island (those powers allowed Bentinck to exile the queen and oust the king): Moore, in particular, also a Scot, was a guest of Gould Francis Leckie during his tenure (and spent several times with Collingwood as well), who gave him a tour of the city and then took him to his home in Tremilia. Moore assessed the Syracusan fortifications (restored by the British) as safe, but he still wanted more protection.

The Scottish soldier believed the annexation of Sicily to Britain was the only way to win the hearts of the Sicilian people, who at that time saw the British only as a belligerent force on their own soil. Moore blamed the Bourbon court for the abuses and miserable conditions in which he found the people of Sicily. Moore, because of his own revolutionary ideas, ended up quarreling with the other British emissaries, and both he and compatriot Leckie had to leave the island (Leckie for publicly coming into conflict with the Bourbon court).

The Sicilian constitution (which could only see the light of day thanks to the constant armed supervision of the British) had been based, as had the many annexationist speeches, on the ancient medieval bond that united English and Sicilians, that is, the time of the Normans (both Sicily and England had in fact been conquered by them during the Viking era); therefore, there could be a return to the ancient union in the name of newly acquired Sicilian rights. However, the events that followed did not allow it.

=== The end of the war ===
Both the Russian ambassador Dimitrij Pavlovič Tatiščev and the member of the French royal family, Duke Louis Philippe of Orléans, warned the Bourbons several times, firmly claiming that the British, and in particular the military and plenipotentiary Lord William Bentinck, were plotting a covert plan to take possession of Sicily, but before these alleged plans could somehow be implemented, Napoleon's fall occurred, which upset everything: the general signed the so-called Treaty of Fontainebleau on April 14, 1814, by which, to obtain peace and an end to the war, he abdicated and handed himself over to the British, who exiled him to the island of Elba.

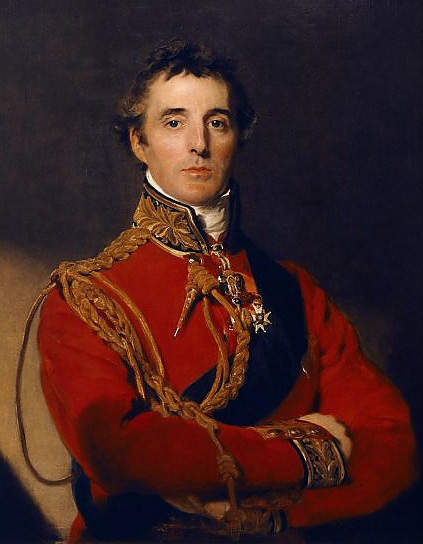
Irishman Arthur Wellesley, 1st Duke of Wellington, commander of the Allied forces that finally defeated Napoleon at Waterloo. At the Congress of Vienna he had reassured the Sicilians about the viability of their new constitution

It was therefore easy to see where it would lead if the sudden fall of Napoleon had not prevented it. A sudden change in English policy in Sicily was responsible for that fall.

— Historical Archives for Eastern Sicily, vol. 21–22, 1925, p. 5.

If Napoleon had not renounced his imperial throne, various sources claim, Britain would have taken the decisive step of annexing Sicily. But with the new scenario, to reach the peace agreement, it was absolutely necessary for it to give up its ambitious aims, as France "would never agree to leave the island to the British."

Napoleon decided to flee Elba and return to Paris. His enemies then united once again in a new alliance: the Seventh Coalition. After the period of Les Cent Jours, Napoleon Bonaparte's army fought its last battle at Waterloo, from which it emerged defeated on June 18, 1815. The British became much harsher on Napoleon and exiled him far away from Europe, to the island of St. Helena, where his influential former minister Talleyrand wanted to confine him from the beginning; a British overseas territory located in the South Atlantic Ocean (Napoleon would die on St. Helena in the year 1821).

== The fate of Sicily at the Congress of Vienna ==
After the Napoleonic wars, nothing could ever return to the way it was, despite the fact that England – and especially Lord Castlereagh – persisted in repeating like a mantra that it was necessary to restore "the ancient territory, the ancient dynasty"; this meant bringing the ancient regime back into vogue; a purpose that would later be strictly enforced by Austria, Prussia and Russia (who would together form the Holy Alliance, aimed at keeping the new political order of Europe under their influence).

As for Sicily, during the Congress of Vienna the British consented to the suppression of the constitution that had come into being precisely because of their will and insistence. The Sicilians, who had relished the possible change, protested, but did so to no avail. Lord Castlereagh showed himself indifferent to the blames of his former wartime allies and sentenced, "Was it not Bonaparte's maxim that he wished to apply his code to the most disparate nations? We have had recent experience of the fallacy of this principle in Sicily. Our constitution could not be adopted there." The Lord further specified, ‘Necessity constituted right, and with the end of that necessity, any pretence of willingness to intervene ceased.’

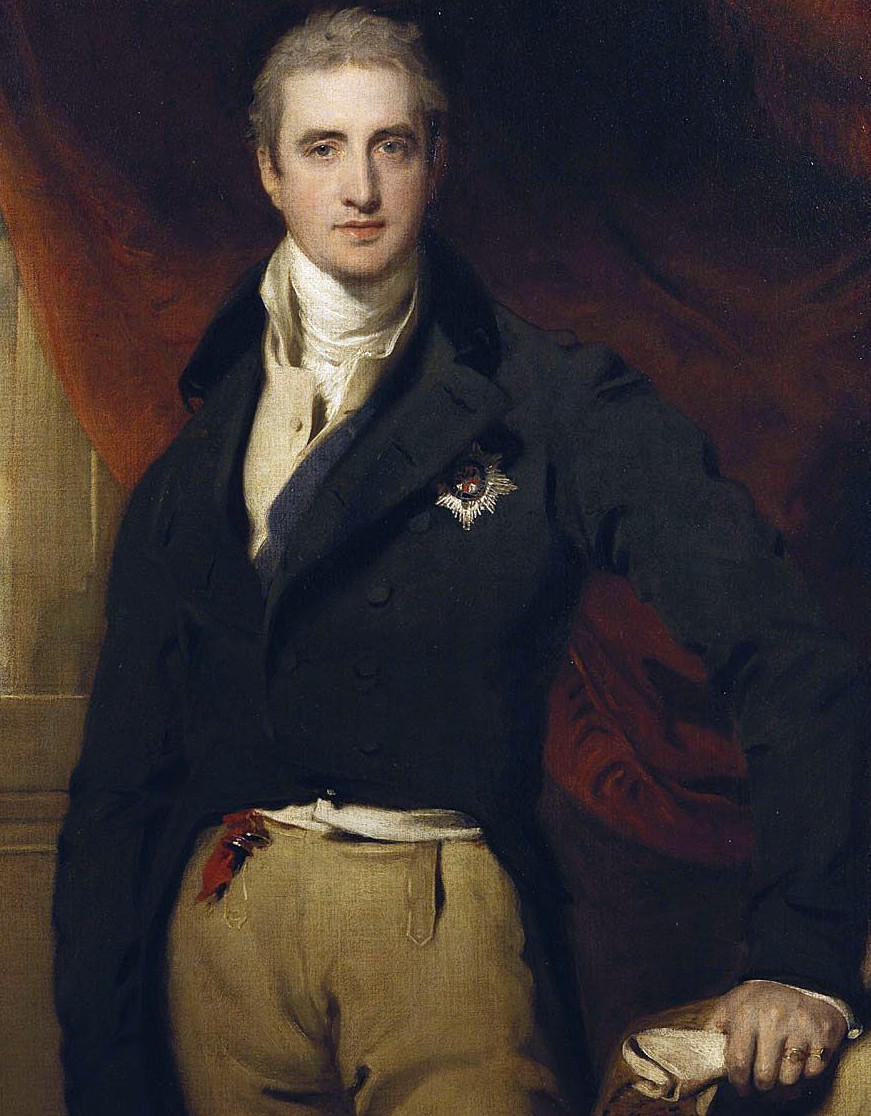
Robert Stewart (aka Lord Castlereagh) pictured in 1817. He was one of the undisputed protagonists of the Congress of Vienna

Lord Castlereagh, however, warned Ferdinand IV of Bourbon (who was close to restoration), warning him that the British would feel compelled to return to the island if the Bourbon monarchy heavily trampled on the rights of Sicilians and persecuted those who, out of necessity, had been part of the 1812 constitutional project.

Lord William Bentinck (who disagreed with the suppression of the Constitution), angrily asserted to Lord Castlereagh that "never has there been a more total suppression of all rights than this; nor could in the annals of any country be found a greater accumulation of injustice, oppression and cruelty" than that suffered by the Sicilians.

Nonetheless, the return of the Bourbons to the throne of Naples was not warmly desired by Britain or Austria (both of whom had made the pact with Murat precisely to prevent the Bourbons of France and Spain from uniting with the Sicilians again, and who had purposely kept the Bourbons on the island in an extremely weak position) but was rather implemented by Talleyrand, who had made it seem unacceptable in the eyes of Europe to keep on the throne a man who had been a loyalist, as well as a relative, of Napoleon (Talleyrand was preparing the return of the Bourbons to the throne of France and had every interest in restoring them in southern Italy as well).

As for the Order of the Knights of the Island of Malta, on the other hand, which had shared its entire existence with Sicily, it could no longer be revived: the British retained with the Treaty of Paris (May 30, 1814) possession of the Maltese archipelago; France, which with the Peace of Amiens still considered Malta to belong to the Order, also resigned itself to ceding it to His Britannic Majesty (Russia did the same). At first the knights tried to resist and established their seat from Russia to the Sicilian city of Catania (which had not been occupied by the British during the Napoleonic wars), but when they realized that there was nothing more they could do to recover their former seat from the British Empire, they, in 1834, settled in Rome (where the Order, which retained the appellation of Malta, was transformed: no longer having to defend any Kingdom in religious wars, its members assumed a purely welfare and hospitaller character).

== Birth of the Kingdom of the Two Sicilies ==
With the Treaty of Casalanza (May 20, 1815) Murat forcibly renounced the Kingdom of Naples, which was handed back by the Allies to King Ferdinand; he suppressed the crown of the Kingdom of Sicily a year later and united it with the Neapolitan crown: in December 1816 the Kingdom of the Two Sicilies was thus formed and the Bourbon changed his title to Ferdinand I of the Two Sicilies. The Sicilians, already disillusioned by the return to absolute monarchy, did not accept the union and soon rose up:

And as there were many disturbances in Messina, Catania and Syracuse, where the rebellion went so far as to insult the legitimate authorities by shouting forbidden words and destroying the insignia of the government, many troops were sent from Naples, together with the Marquis Del Carretto, Minister of State for the General Police, to whom, by a royal decree of July 31st, all the powers of the Alter Ego were transferred for the valleys of Messina, Catania and Syracuse, to restore peace and tranquillity and to animate the good men to a wise conduct. Many of those who had taken part in the various rebellions were persecuted and punished, and Syracuse was severely punished.

The Congress of Vienna had left the peoples of Europe disgruntled and dissatisfied in the post-French Revolutionary period. The spark in Europe started in Spain in 1820 (uprisings of 1820–1821): Spain, rebelling against its own absolutist regime, obtained a constitution, which also awakened in the Sicilians a desire to return to the constitutional government of 1812, which had been formed on their island during the British occupation. In Sicily, however, the revolutionary movement took on different connotations, all conflicting with each other: there were those who, in addition to the constitution, wished to obtain the independence of the island, those who were content to be part of a constitutional Kingdom (the Neapolitans having also revolted to obtain a unitary constitution) and those who finally remained loyal to the king and his will.

The new duo-Sicilian Kingdom thus experienced social unrest and rebellions from the very beginning: the former, however, affected only a part of Sicily, the western part, and especially the capital Palermo, while the eastern part of the island remained almost entirely silent and quiet. Those first uprisings were quelled by the troops of the Austrian Empire, sent by order of King Ferdinand following the Congress of Ljubljana in 1821. The Sicilian situation changed decidedly in aspect with the onset of the cholera epidemic of the 1830s and its effects on Bourbon policy: this time the spark started in eastern Sicily; from Syracuse, whose rebellion served to rekindle the never quite dormant revolutionary plans of those Sicilians most determined to end the union of the two Bourbon crowns: this would lead to the well-known Sicilian revolution of 1848.

=== Riots of 1820: Palermo revolts ===
The suppression of the Sicilian constitution of 1812 sparked a protest movement on the island, and on June 15, 1820, Palermo's independentists rose up (about 14,000 rifles from the Palermo arsenal fell into the hands of the insurgents). Prince Francis I of Bourbon, Duke of Calabria, eldest son of King Ferdinand I of the Two Sicilies and since 1817 Lieutenant General of Sicily, was forced to leave the Sicilian capital on June 27 to take refuge in Naples.

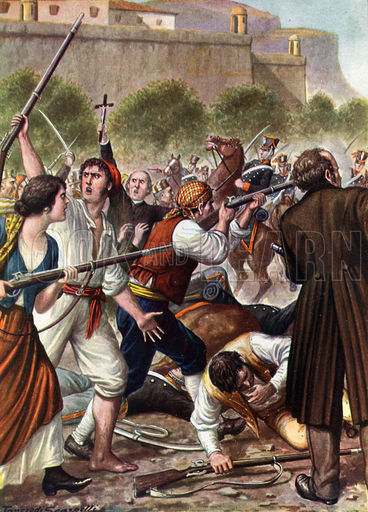
The insurrection of Palermo in 1820

A government was then established in Palermo (June 23), led by Prince Giovanni Luigi Moncada and Giuseppe Alliata di Villafranca, which restored the constitution inherited from the British.

In Palermo, and its province, the Neapolitan constitutionalists had no notable following, as the former capital of the Kingdom of Sicily was quivering for the return of the privileges and executive powers it had retained until its forced union with the continental royal capital. They entrusted the Syracusan nobleman Gaetano Abela (a soldier by profession, one of the last to have donned the uniform of a knight of Malta and among the first separatists in modern Sicilian history) with the task of getting the Val di Noto to rise in favor of independence, while two other guerrilla commanders were tasked with getting the Val di Mazara and Val Demone to rise. Abela was thus directed against his own homeland, Syracuse, which at that time appeared serene and untroubled by the various pro-independence or pro-constitution political factions, since its people, like many other Sicilian peoples at the time, did not want to meddle in public affairs. Abela's attempt was crushed by his own Palermo militia, which, being too seditious and undisciplined, turned against him, disarming him, looting his war equipment, and thus interrupting his march to southeastern Sicily (Abela was eventually sentenced to death, which was publicly carried out in Palermo by the Bourbon authorities).

On July 23, a delegation was sent to the court in Naples to officially request the restoration of the Kingdom of Sicily, while still remaining under the Bourbon monarchy, and definitively sanction the constitutional return. King Ferdinand refused, and on August 30 he sent an army (about 6,500 soldiers who were added to the same number garrisoned at the citadel of Messina) under the orders of General Florestano Pepe, who, after some clashes, entered into an agreement with the Sicilian government on September 22 at Termini Imerese by which the final decision to establish a Sicilian parliament was referred to the representatives of the municipalities about to be elected.

The so-called "Convention of Termini" was also ratified on October 5 by the people of Palermo, but the newly formed Neapolitan parliament, or parliament of the Two Sicilies, based in Naples, rejected it and on October 14 recalled Pepe from the island and sent General Pietro Colletta in his place, who, to suppress the independence uprisings altogether, reconquered rebel Sicily, enacting bloody struggles and re-establishing in it, on November 7, 1820, the will of the central Neapolitan government.

The island, once again subjugated to the Bourbons at the court of Naples, also had Austrian military contingents sent from Vienna, with the complicity of Ferdinand, who in the meantime had the constitution abolished even in the mainland part of his kingdom. These soldiers were placed under the command of German General Ludwig von Wallmoden-Gimborn, with the task of maintaining the absolutist monarchical order.

=== Riots of 1837: Syracuse and Catania revolt ===
In the summer of '37 Syracuse became, along with Palermo, Agrigento, and Trapani, one of the places most affected by the cholera epidemic. In the Aretusean city, however, something even more sinister happened in addition that made the situation unbearable: the people, already panicked by the high mortality of the disease, were led to believe that this calamity had come down to them through the work of mysterious poisoners; and not just any poisoners, but men trusted by the king: his emissaries. In essence, it was strongly rumored on the streets of Syracuse that cholera had been sent to poison the Sicilian people at the behest of the government of the new King Ferdinand II of the Two Sicilies, who was angry with the Sicilians because the latter wanted their independence from Naples.

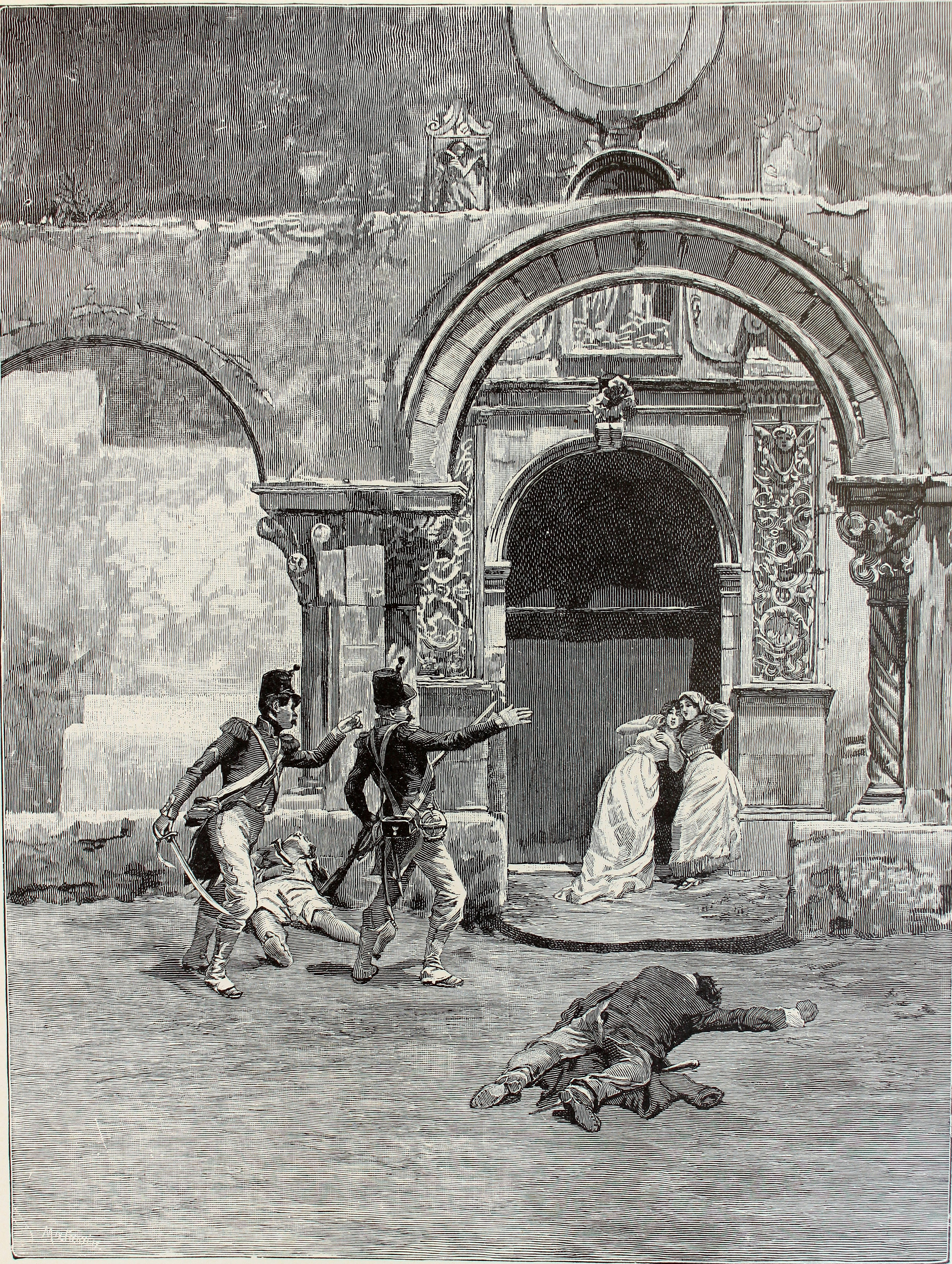
Bourbon soldiers in Syracuse during the days of the 1837 uprising

Syracuse, as the first among the Sicilian cities, experienced hatred mixed with fear; feelings that soon involved neighboring Catania and Messina as well. The people of Ortigiano rose up and sought out the executioners: the food and water poisoners. The Syracusans' conviction was worsened by the confession made by the Frenchman Joseph Schwentzer: he had been one of the suspects arrested by the people, but instead of denying the poison theory, he, perhaps in an attempt to buy time, supported it, claiming that the poisoner was a German named Baynardy, sent by Austria in complicity with the Bourbon government; while he was instead an emissary of France and that he was meant to observe the people of Italy and Sicily. His words only obtained a greater inclination to revenge, nor could they save his life.

The incitement of the people against the Bourbons, even before Schwentzer's statements, started from the local revolutionaries, who had been trying since 1820 to get Syracuse to rise up, causing it to imitate the anti-Neapolitan uprisings that were already taking place in western Sicily. Whether the leaders of the insurrection really believed the poisoning they claimed to have discovered remains uncertain to this day; without any doubt, however, the poison represented the decisive turning point for them: the fire on which to fan the flames of revolution throughout Sicily. The Syracusans committed massacres and instigated neighboring towns to do the same: Floridia, Sortino and Avola were guilty of the same crimes.

Catania, in the wake of the Syracusan events, rose up in turn and tried to organize a larger revolt, involving the entire eastern side of the island, but Messina, though it tried, could not follow, since it was closely guarded by the kings because of its namesake citadel, and Syracuse itself was divided internally: the revolutionaries were pushing for the city to be declared a rebel, but the people were convinced that having brought the covert plots of the Neapolitan government into the light of day, the king would be grateful to the city, since it had saved him from his traitors, and would forgive it for the unrest it had committed. Therefore, they did not think further revolt was necessary. The Catanese were left alone.

The Syracusans, however, who were completely unprepared when the kings came, soon realized that there would be no forgiveness from the king. While the response of the Syracusans to the revolutionary instigations was cruel, equally ruthless was the reaction of the Bourbon army against them. The task of the royals was to restore order; to bring the rebellious cities under martial law back under the Bourbon insignia: Ferdinand II sent the police minister of the Kingdom of the Two Sicilies, Marquis Francesco Saverio Del Carretto (he was already known to the revolutionaries for having quelled just as fiercely the Cilento uprisings in 1828, during which he destroyed entire towns), to quell the rioters with absolute powers.

Del Carretto, arriving from Reggio Calabria, quelled in an exceedingly violent manner the revolt in Catania (which at those junctures cursed Syracuse, declaring it a liar, guilty of having seduced the Etnean people with the story of poison and deserving for this reason of the bloody chastisement already suffered by the Catanese), later headed to the Aretusean capital and with his usual violent methods quelled the rebellion among the Syracusans as well. Between Syracuse and Catania, 750 people were arrested, of whom 123 were sentenced to death.

Before leaving, Del Carretto officially declared Syracuse to have forfeited its title of capital: he accused it of villainy and rebellion. He said that it was no longer tolerable for His Majesty's government to maintain as head of the province a city that had instigated massacres and made insolent even its neighboring populations, so, on August 4, 1837, its title was given to Noto – an ancient city that had given its name to the Val di Noto since the time of Arab rule – which had remained until that time uninvolved in the calls of the Syracusans.

Before the upheavals of '37, eastern Sicily had remained alienated from the Palermitan desire to break away from the ancient Kingdom of Naples, and after these upheavals this possibility was a constant stimulus to it.

=== The Sulphur Crisis ===
In 1838 Ferdinand II faced his first serious diplomatic conflict with a European power that had hitherto been his ally, or at least not hostile: Great Britain.

This issue had erupted because of the monopolistic concession the Neapolitan ruler had made with France (England's eternal rival) regarding the sale of the precious mineral found in abundance only in Sicily (exactly only in central Sicily), which until then had been exploited, in an equally monopolistic manner, exclusively by the British. There were only three Sicilian centers, however, where the British managed the sulfur trade: Syracuse, Messina, and Palermo.

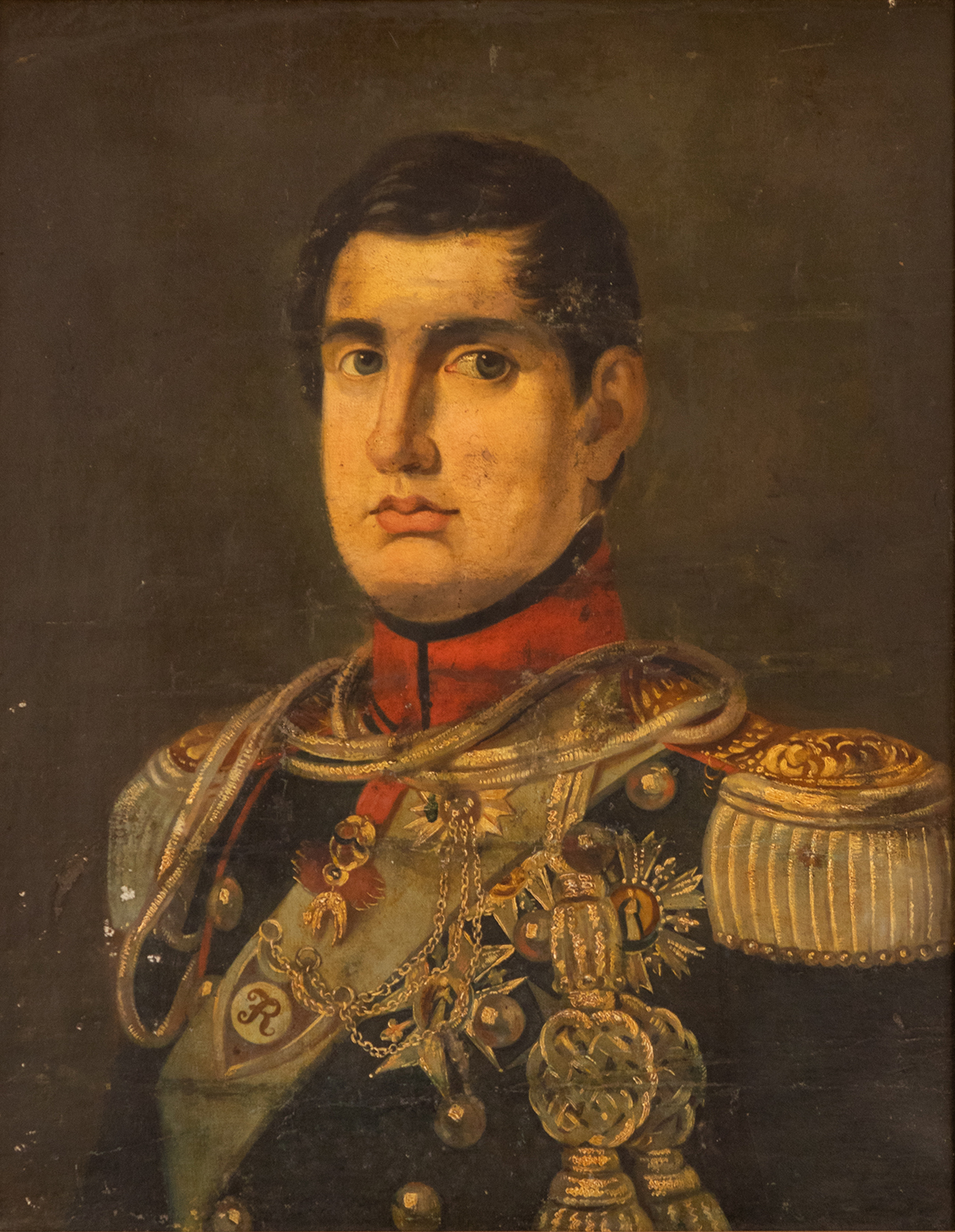
Ferdinand II of the Two Sicilies portrayed in the year 1840

Ferdinand, in anticipation of a potential invasion, given the high tension of the moment, dispatched soldiers to the island's fortresses, with the task of resisting a possible British aggression (in the continental part of his kingdom, militant incidents had already occurred between Neapolitan merchant ships and His Britannic Majesty's warships).

As the issue did not subside, King Ferdinand II of Bourbon decided to watch over Sicily in person, arriving there in 1840 and setting up the main camp of war operations near the Strait of Messina. On that occasion he went to the island's main fortress, represented by Syracuse and, even more specifically, its island part, Ortigia. The Bourbon wanted to inspect its ammunition, artillery and infantry. He judged the efforts made not enough: against England it was necessary to be stronger. The inhabitants of the fortress, highly skeptical about the chances of success of this eventual war (considering that the United Kingdom of Queen Victoria had no rivals on the seas and only France was at that time able to hold, with difficulty, a lead over the English), had no illusions when the king promised clear improvements in social conditions, as they took those words of his as dictated solely by fear of the ongoing situation.

Finally, the war between the British Empire and the Kingdom of the Two Sicilies did not break out, thanks to the mediation of France, which succeeded in soothing the tempers of the respective parties to the dispute and advised Ferdinand to cancel the contract he had made with his own people, so as to settle the sulfur issue once and for all. Ferdinand agreed.

However, in moments of tension, when the British captured the Neapolitan ships and held them hostage in Malta, the British minister Lord Palmerston instructed his men not to foment any revolt of the Sicilians against the Bourbon government, manifesting that there was evidently a high risk that this might happen.

== Riots of 1848: Sicily declares itself independent ==
=== First phase of the revolution ===
Although it had been the subject of visits and writings of several distinguished Italian figures who were protesting for the unification of the Italian peninsula (the newspapers of the unitary republican movement of Giovine Italia, founded by Giuseppe Mazzini, reached and spread in Sicily via Malta), Sicily decided in '48 to break away from them – at the time it considered unification a utopian goal - and to rebel against the Bourbon monarchy with the sole aim of proclaiming itself an independent kingdom.

From '38 to '48 Sicilian revolutionaries had held numerous meetings among themselves, in which the independence hypothesis had been increasingly affirmed (as early as '40 the order of uprising had been established: Palermo would rebel first, then Messina would follow, then Catania, then Syracuse and finally Trapani, seeking to involve the continental part of the Bourbon Kingdom as well).

Aversion against the Bourbons and against the Neapolitan government had also been growing: in their last meetings they went so far as to say that Sicily would be better off with the Turks than with its current state (comparing, provocatively, the period in which Sicily suffered attacks from the Ottoman Empire to the period of the unsatisfactory Neapolitan government; preferring the former to the latter).

The Syracusans, who with curiosity and anxiety were often questioned by other Sicilians on the question of poison – about how they had managed to uncover the cruel governmental machination (which by now had become a topic dear to every revolutionary on the island) – strongly supported what had been established in the meetings and gave their full support to whatever the "universal will of Sicily had been."

The revolutionary uprisings of 1848 also marked the return of the British to the island: Britain, concerned about possible interference by other powers in the Sicilian question, first intervened by bringing military and mediators to the cities of Sicily that had already seen their stay during the Napoleonic period. It was almost immediately joined by France, so that Sicily's revolutionaries, in their struggles for independence, deluded themselves into thinking that they could subjugate Neapolitan and Bourbon power by relying almost solely on foreign forces, not considering the contradictory interests each of these two powers had in their regard.

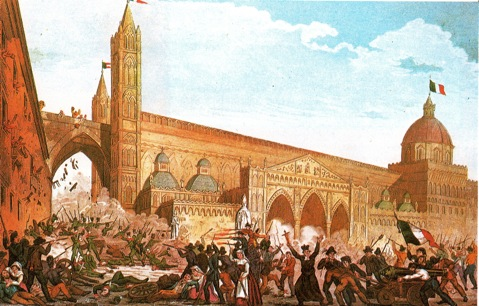
Palermo in revolt in 1848

The first part of the plan had worked well: the people of Palermo had risen up on January 12, 1848, and with a popular uprising led by Rosolino Pilo and Giuseppe La Masa had succeeded in driving the Neapolitan kings out of the capital (this also represented the first event in chronological order of what was called the Springtime of the peoples in Europe). Then other uprisings occurred spontaneously: the second of the 7 capitals to rise up was Agrigento (Girgenti at the time), on January 22; followed by the Agrigentines, on January 29, Catania, and on the same day Caltanissetta also rose up. On January 30 it was Trapani's turn, while on February 4 Noto had also joined the rebellion.

To the Sicilian General Committee (located in Palermo) on January 29 arrived the accessions of more than 100 municipalities on the island, which had successfully joined the revolution.

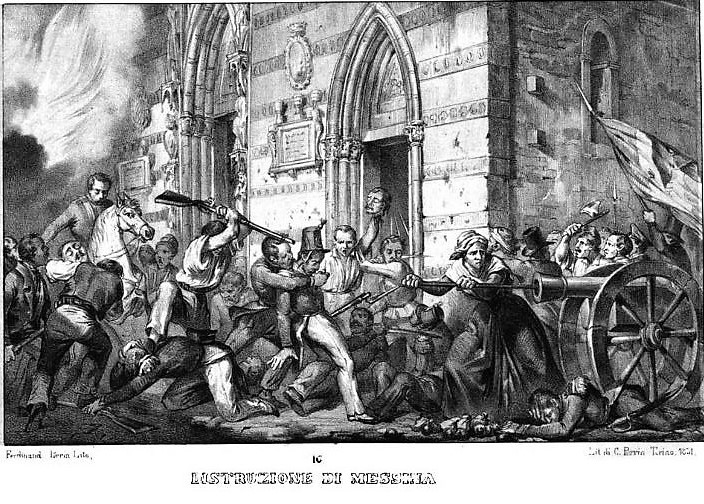
Messina in 1848: clashes between the Royal Bourbons and the insurgents

However, quite a different situation was that of the two most heavily guarded and equipped fortresses on the island: the Citadels of Messina and Syracuse, which, having within them a considerable fortified system and numerous royal troops, could not be raised as quickly: Messina, however, being unlike Syracuse free within itself (while the Syracusans lived inside a fortress, the Messinians were rather threatened by a fortress that stood near them: the military citadel of the same name), took control of their city there, declaring themselves free and beginning to bombard the adjacent fortress.

Only Syracuse remained entirely in the hands of the kings: every day new Neapolitan soldiers arrived there, who, leaving the centers from where they were put on the run, retreated inside the Aretusean fortress, awaiting orders from Naples. The king, meanwhile, was in great difficulty, for the Neapolitan people had also turned against him, demanding the suppressed constitution of 1820. He granted it and gave news of it in all the cities of Sicily. However, the island unanimously rejected it: this constitution did not provide for the separation of the two kingdoms – which for the Sicilians was now a firm point – they wanted the one of 1812, when the island was guaranteed its own parliamentary monarchy.

It was at this point that Britain intervened: Lord Palmerston commissioned Lord Minto to mediate peace with the government in Naples. The Royal Navy's Mediterranean Fleet, stationed in Palmas bay (Gulf of Palmas, Sardinia), was dispatched to Malta and placed under the command of Vice-Admiral William Parker, 1st Baronet of Shenstone, who was tasked with watching over the Sicilian waters and acting as spokesman for the wishes of his nation's government. A little later France, recovering from the February Revolution, by which it had just proclaimed itself a Republic (a prelude to Napoleon III's rise to power and the birth of the Second French Empire), arrived, joining the British, sending to Sicilian waters its vice-admiral Charles Baudin, commander-in-chief in the Mediterranean of the naval forces of the Second French Republic, while mediation with Ferdinand was entrusted to Parisian minister plenipotentiary Alphonse de Rayneval.

The influential intervention of the British forced Ferdinand II to leave Syracuse free, albeit momentarily, as well. With the cession of the last Sicilian fortress to the revolutionaries, Palermo was able to declare independence on behalf of the island: on March 25, Sicily rose to independent statehood, and a new Kingdom of Sicily was born. Palermo's Ruggero Settimo, former president of the insurrectional committee, was elected "Father of the Fatherland" by the Sicilians. The truce with the court of Naples was nevertheless time-limited: foreign intervention had only been able to impose an armistice on the Bourbons, after which the sovereign would feel entitled to take back the Sicilian lands by force and reestablish them under his own rule.

=== The search for a king for the island ===
The political order of Italy in the 1840s

At the beginning of the summer, all the Sicilian towns formed a National Guard (Sicilian National Army). Meanwhile, the Sicilian government, after various discussions, decided to offer the island's crown to an Italian prince on 11 July: the choice, conditioned by England's wishes, fell on the head of the Duke of Genoa, Ferdinando of Savoy, son of the King of Piedmont, Charles Albert of Savoy. France, on the other hand, had proposed that the Sicilians elect as their new king the very young heir to the throne of the Grand Duchy of Tuscany, Karl of Hapsburg-Lorraine, but since the Tuscan prince needed a regent and England's influence on the Sicilians was stronger than France's, the proposal to elect another Hapsburg to the Sicilian throne fell on deaf ears.

The Sicilians sent their own representation to Marmirolo, in the Mantua region (where the events of the First Italian War of Independence were unfolding), with the intention of meeting the chosen prince. It was clear from the outset that their wish would never be realized: the duke of Genoa showed himself completely disinterested in the Sicilians' offer; he had no interest in occupying that throne, occupied as he was with military affairs in northern Italy. The duke had also been to Sicily in person; he had been there in 1845, accompanying the Russian imperial Romanov family, and in the city of Palermo he fell in love with the tsar's daughter, Olga of Russia, whom he was ultimately unable to marry because of the princess's failure to convert to Catholicism.

On the other hand, the Duke's father, Charles Albert, was reluctant, hoping for a union between the two crowns (but not forgetting that the Sicilians wanted to create their own dynasty, independent of anyone else), but wanting solid guarantees from England: he was aware of the extremely turbulent past between the two nations, when, following the Treaty of Utrecht, Sicily had been wrested from Spain and united with the House of Savoy, concentrating the wrath of the Spanish on the Piedmontese and creating a series of high tensions with half of Europe. Tensions that threatened to resurface, since King Ferdinand II of Bourbon had already warned Charles Albert that if his son accepted the throne of Sicily, Naples would declare war on Piedmont (which would go against the union that the Italian states were trying to establish among themselves).

England reacted coldly to Savoy, making it clear that it would recognise the Duke as King of Sicily only after a successful military conquest of that throne, and that the British would not fight for him. France was even colder: having proposed Habsburg-Lorraine and not Savoy, it would have preferred Sicily to finally declare a republic and join it. This was compounded by the total indifference of the Savoy prince, who had no desire to conquer a throne. The Sicilians received a refusal from Turin.

=== The reconquest of the Bourbons ===
Ferdinand II of Bourbon did not wait any longer: in the late summer of 1848 he prepared his own expedition to reconquer rebellious Sicily and at the beginning of September sent his men to Messina; he was facilitated by the fortress of the same name, which, unlike in Syracuse, had not been disarmed and had always remained ready to fire: only the armistice had so far held it back.

The first city to be recaptured by the Neapolitans was Messina, which was besieged and attacked by 16,000 soldiers. General Carlo Filangieri, Prince of Satriano, led the troops. Messina was bombed and plundered: massacres and rapes, even in the churches, caused the people of Messina to flee en masse. Many of them managed to escape by boarding the French and British warships, which had remained in the harbour for days, silently watching the massacres: the attacks began on the 3rd September, and by the 9th Messina was already considered conquered.

Finally, on the 11th of September, the French Admiral Baudin, persuaded by the excessive cruelty of the conquest, decided, in agreement with the English Admiral Parker, to impose a second armistice on Ferdinand's troops in the name of God and humanity. The two admirals' initiative was immediately supported by their respective nations, France and England. However, before the Prince of Satriano received the order to accept the truce from Naples by telegraph, after vigorous protests, he had already sent his freshly conquered fleet to Syracuse on the same day. This second truce, which prevented the kings from immediately attacking the other main island fortress, only succeeded in postponing the fall of Ruggero Settimo's government for a while.

When the offensive resumed in April of the following year, the Sicilians were still lacking weapons and an adequate military setup (there had been no coordination among the troops scattered across the island, which were also far apart physically). Ferdinand II dispatched this time 24,000 royal soldiers for the reconquest. Thus, on April 6, 1849, Catania fell: the Etnean city was abandoned to pillage and exactly what had previously happened after the conquest of Messina was repeated. The surrender of Syracuse, on the other hand, was conditioned by the constant presence of the admirals of France and Great Britain; they offered the fortress the opportunity to take advantage of their influential mediation, sparing the population the torments already suffered by Messina and Catania, but in exchange they demanded the unconditional surrender of the city to the royals. Accepting this proposal, the Syracusans surrendered without a fight on April 9, 1849.

The rest of Sicily, following the example of the Aretusean city, capitulated without fighting: the last capitulation was that of Palermo, which also accepted, on May 15, 1849, the mediation of officers sent by Admirals Parker and Baudin. The Kingdom of Sicily once again ceased to exist.

=== The role of the great powers in the revolution ===
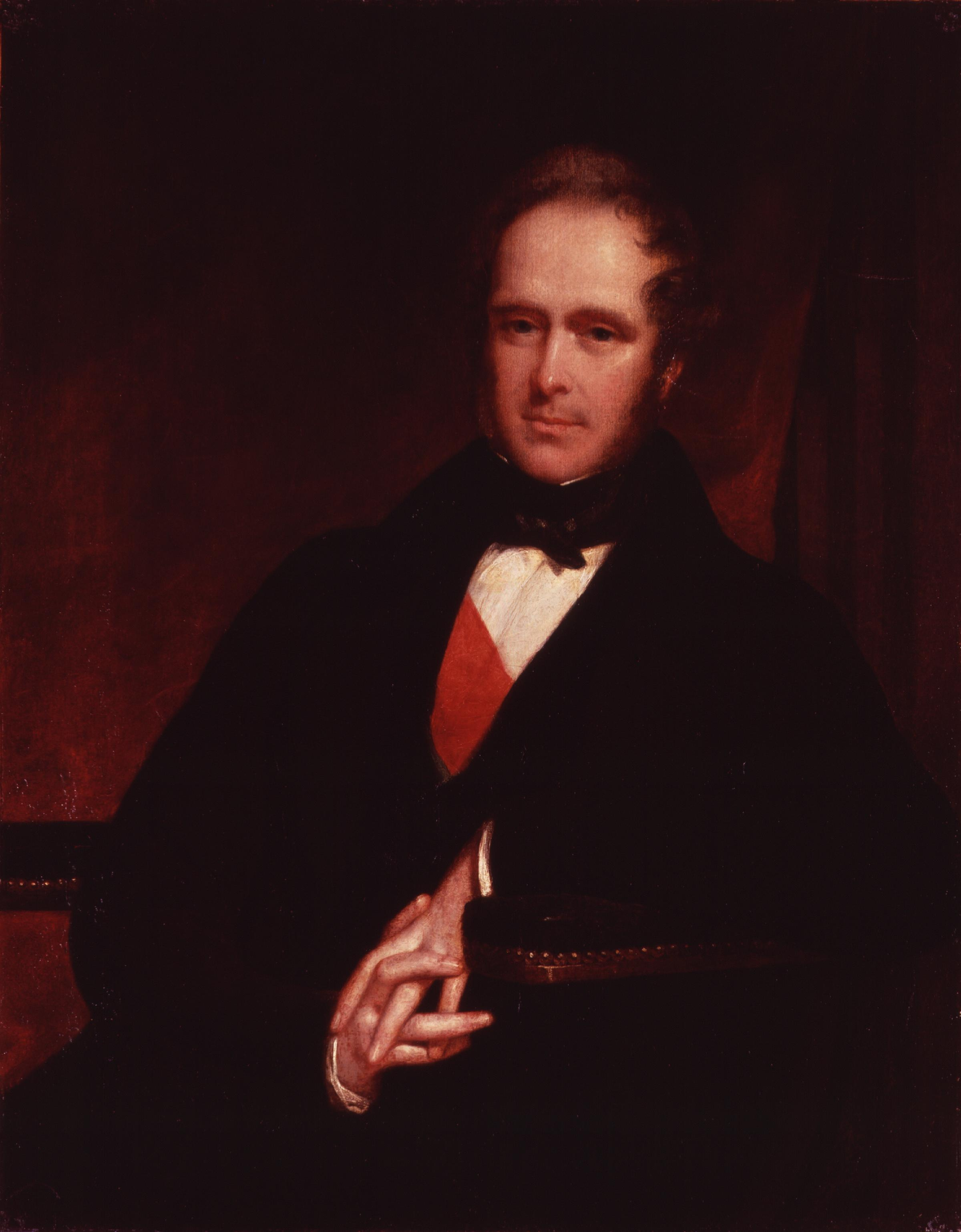
Henry John Temple, 3rd Viscount Palmerston was strongly criticized in Europe for England's behavior toward the Sicilian question

The Sicilian question attracted the attention of much of Europe at the time, and some nations, specifically Britain and France, wanted to elevate themselves as mediating powers in the affair, seeking a solution that could pacify the Bourbon government with the Sicilians.

Nevertheless, the thought that circulated in Europe from the start was another: Sicily, separated from the rest of Italy and placed alone in the center of the Mediterranean, would be easy prey for various powers. The island's revolution was thus capable of undermining the European balance (a key theme in the era of the balance of power and the Concert of Europe). France became convinced that England's meddling in the Sicilian revolution was for the sole purpose of taking the island away from the Bourbons of Naples and placing it under British rule; at that point, the continued denials of the Sicilians, who assured that they did not want to be annexed to Britain in any way, were to no avail.

With the French Revolution of 1848, Britain's primary objective became to prevent Sicily from also declaring a republic. With France's intervention in the Sicilian question, a sharp contradiction arose in the aims of the rebellion: there was a republican minority party and a monarchist majority party.

When England and France began to argue about who or what should govern Sicily, the Sicilians, who were heavily dependent on military aid from both powers, were left in the lurch: emblematically, ministers from the United Kingdom went so far as to tell the Sicilian Minister of War, who kept pressing for the island to be supplied with arms for its soldiers, that Sicily did not need its own army after all.

France also did not send the necessary war aid to the Sicilians. The two great powers had slowly agreed among themselves to reunite Sicily with the crown of Naples, thus avoiding a war of interests between themselves: Sicily would become neither a French nor an English land.

The heightening of European tensions as Sicily sought a new independent king made both nations wary: both Spain and Russia had warned that they would not tolerate any changes in the present Kingdom of the Two Sicilies: the Spaniards boasted of their kinship with the Bourbons of Naples and were therefore prepared to act, while the Russians, who were linked to Ferdinand by a permanent alliance and whose imperial family had resided on the island of Sicily for almost a year (Tsar Nicholas I Romanov stayed in Palermo for a month while his wife, Tsarina Alexandra Fjodorovna, and daughter, Tsarina Olga of Russia, and daughter, Olga of Russia, stayed there from October 1845 to the spring of 1846 for health reasons), openly warned that if France or England in any way violated the neutrality with which they had intended to intervene in the Sicilian question, Russia would not hesitate to come into conflict with these two nations, even militarily.

Those who intervened in the island's affairs could therefore only do so "in the name of humanity", without any personal gain; a situation that ended up bringing the Sicilians back under the hegemony of the Neapolitan Bourbons.

== The Expedition of the Thousand and the end of the Bourbon period ==
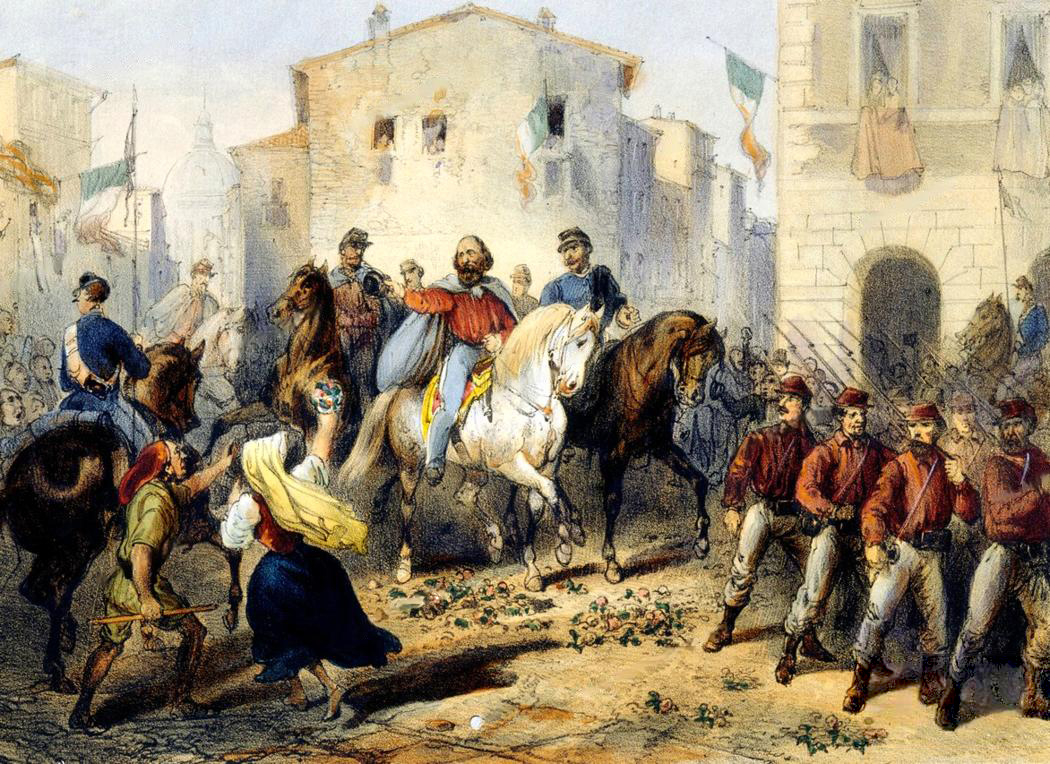
Garibaldians enter Messina

Since then, the Sicilian barons had developed a hatred for the Bourbons, who were guilty of annihilating the ancient Kingdom of Sicily and making it a province of the Kingdom of Naples (even though the new state was called the Kingdom of the Two Sicilies). In 1853 and 1856 there were other uprisings led by Francesco Bentivegna and Salvatore Spinuzza, who were executed. In April 1860 the rebellion resumed under the leadership of Francesco Riso in the Gancia uprising.

Soon after, Sicilians supported Garibaldi and the Expedition of the Thousand, which landed on May 11 at Marsala and was joined in the siege of Palermo by patriots led by Rosolino Pilo. Three days after the landing Garibaldi formed a dictatorial government. On May 30 Palermo was conquered, and on July 27 the Garibaldians entered Messina, the city from which they moved to land on the continent.

On October 21, with the Plebiscite of the Sicilian provinces of 1860, Sicily was annexed to the constituting Kingdom of Italy.

== Economic situation ==
Economically, the Bourbons did not associate Sicily with the industrial activities that began in Campania and Calabria. In fact, railways and industry were created only in the Neapolitan region (understood as the continental part of the kingdom and therefore the territory "on this side of the lighthouse", which stretched from the Abruzzi to Calabria). In Sicily, however, the production and trade of sulfur, salt, marble, citrus fruits and wheat developed (Sicily had been the "granary of Europe" since the time of the ancient Romans). In Sicily, as in the south, emigration was still an almost unknown phenomenon.

On the other hand, maritime trade developed: the Flotte Riunite Florio was a shipping company established in Palermo in 1840 as the Società dei battelli a vapore, by the entrepreneur Vincenzo Florio.

Vessels registered with the Sicilian Maritime Commissions as of 1859; Vessels sorted by Maritime Commission
Maritime Commission	Number	Tonnage (t)
Palermo	256	20.492
Messina	279	14.036
Catania	254	11.551
Noto	136	2.512
Girgenti	313	2.765
Caltanissetta	69	1.129
Trapani	517	8.970
TOTAL	1.814	61.455

The Sicula Transatlantica company, owned by the Palermo shipowners Luigi and Salvatore De Pace, was equipped with the "Sicilia", a Scottish-built steamship that, in 1854, became the first Italian steamship to reach America, sailing from Palermo to New York City in 26 days.

== See also ==
- Sicilian revolution of 1848
- Dictatorship of Garibaldi
- List of Sicilian monarchs
- Expedition of the Thousand
- History of Sicily

== Bibliography ==
- Great Britain (1849). Correspondence Respecting the Affairs of Naples and Sicily: 1848–1849.
- Giuffrida, Romualdo (1985). Nel Palazzo dei Normanni di Palermo: ritratti di viceré, presidenti del regno e luogotenenti generali di Sicilia (1747–1840). Accademia nazionale di scienze, lettere e arti.
- de Benedictis, Emmanuele (1861). Siracusa sotto la mala signoria degli ultimi Borboni.
- Bufardeci, Emilio (1868). Le funeste conseguenze di un pregiudizio popolare: memorie storiche.
- Chindemi, Salvatore (1869). Siracusa dal 1826 al 1860 pel professore Salvatore Chindemi.
- Privitera, Serafino (1986) [1878]. Storia di Siracusa antica e moderna. Forni. ISBN 88-271-0748-7.
- Whitaker, Tina Scalia (1948). Sicilia e Inghilterra: ricordi politici; la vita degli esuli italiani in Inghilterra, 1848-1870; con una premessa di Biagio Pace.
- Renda, Francesco (1963). La Sicilia nel 1812. Salvatore Sciascia Editore.
- Hamel, Pasquale (1986). La Sicilia al Parlamento delle due Sicilie 1820/21. Palermo: Thule editore.
- Romeo, Rosario (1950). Il Risorgimento in Sicilia. Bari: Editori Laterza.
- Acton, Harold (1997). Gli ultimi Borboni di Napoli (1825–1861). Giunti.
- Palmieri, Nicolò (1848). Storia della rivoluzione di Sicilia nel 1820. Palermo.
- Pace Gravina, Giacomo (2014). Il codice e la sciabola. La giustizia militare nella Sicilia dei Borbone tra repressione del dissenso politico ed emergenza penale (1819–1860). Bonanno editore.
