= Colonial empire =

Overseas possessions of a nation-state

Map of modern empires across the world between 1492 and 1945

A colonial empire is a state engaging in colonization, and possibly establishing or maintaining colonies, infused with some form of coloniality and colonialism.

Before the expansion of early modern European powers, other empires had conquered and colonized territories, such as the Roman Empire in Europe, North Africa, and West Asia. Modern colonial empires first emerged with a race of exploration between the then most advanced European maritime powers, Portugal and Spain, during the 15th century. The initial impulse behind these dispersed maritime empires and those that followed was trade, driven by the new ideas and the capitalism that grew out of the European Renaissance. Agreements were also made to divide the world up between them in 1479, 1493, and 1494. European imperialism was born out of competition between European Christians and Ottoman Muslims, the latter of which rose up quickly in the 14th century and forced the Spaniards and Portuguese to seek new trade routes to India, and to a lesser extent, China.

Although colonies existed in classical antiquity, especially amongst the Phoenicians and the ancient Greeks who settled many islands and coasts of the Mediterranean Sea, these colonies were politically independent from the city-states they originated from, and thus did not constitute a colonial empire. This paradigm shifted by the time of the Ptolemaic, Seleucid, and Roman Empires.

The European countries of the modern era that are most remembered as colonial empires are the United Kingdom, France, Spain, Portugal, Netherlands, Germany, Belgium, Italy and sometimes Russia with Sweden.

== History ==
=== European colonial empires ===
Portugal began establishing the first global trade network and one of the first colonial empires under the leadership of Henry the Navigator. The empire spread throughout a vast number of territories distributed across the globe (especially at one time in the 16th century) that are now parts of 60 different sovereign states. Portugal would eventually control Brazil, territories such as what is now Uruguay and some fishing ports in north, in the Americas; Angola, Mozambique, Portuguese Guinea, and São Tomé and Príncipe (among other territories and bases) in the North and the Subsaharan Africa; cities, forts or territories in all the Asian subcontinents, as Muscat, Ormus and Bahrain (amongst other bases) in the Persian Gulf; Goa, Bombay and Daman and Diu (amongst other coastal cities) in India; Portuguese Ceylon; Malacca, bases in Southeast Asia and Oceania, as Makassar, Solor, Banda, Ambon and others in the Moluccas, Portuguese Timor; and the granted entrepôt-base of Macau and the entrepôt-enclave of Dejima (Nagasaki) in East Asia, amongst other smaller or short-lived possessions.

The territorial evolution of modern colonial empires and some of their successor states (such as USSR, Turkey)

During its Siglo de Oro, the Spanish Empire had possession of Mexico, South America, the Philippines, all of southern Italy, a stretch of territories from the Duchy of Milan to the Netherlands, Luxembourg, and Belgium, parts of Burgundy, and many colonial settlements in the Americas, Africa, and Asia. Possessions in Europe, Africa, the Atlantic Ocean, the Americas, the Pacific Ocean, and East Asia qualified the Spanish Empire as attaining a global presence. From 1580 to 1640 the Portuguese Empire and the Spanish Empire were conjoined in a personal union of its Habsburg monarchs during the period of the Iberian Union, but beneath the highest level of government, their separate administrations were maintained.

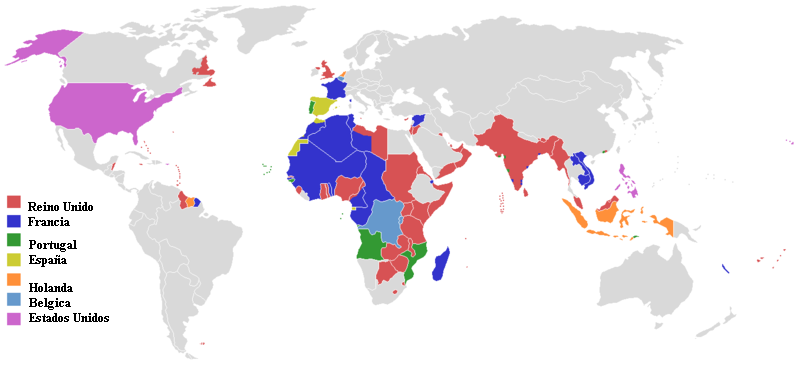
Colonial powers in 1945

Subsequent colonial empires included the English, Dutch and French empires. Throughout the 19th and early 20th century, by virtue of its technological and maritime supremacy, the British Empire steadily expanded to become by far the largest empire in history; at its height ruling over a quarter of the Earth's land area and 24% of the population. Britain's role as a global hegemon during this time ushered in a century of "British Peace", lasting from the end of the French Revolutionary and Napoleonic Wars to the start of World War I. During the New Imperialism, Belgium, Italy and Germany also built their colonial empires in Africa, while Japan started to encroach into former Chinese domains after they have settled their own reformation.

=== Timeline ===
The chart below shows the span of some European colonial empires.

- Black lines mark the year of the empire's largest territorial extent of land area.
- Red represents that the empire is at that time a monarchy.
- Blue represents that the empire is at that time a republic.

== List of colonial empires ==
=== European ===
- (Belgium) Belgian Empire (1908–1962)
  - Possessions in Africa
    - Belgian Congo (1908–1960)
    - Ruanda-Urundi (1922–1962)
  - Possessions in Asia
    - Belgian concession of Tianjin (1902–1931)
- British Empire (1707–1997/present)
  - Evolution of the British Empire; Angevin Empire; (Kingdom of England) English colonial empire (1585–1707)
  - (Scotland) Scottish colonial empire (1621–1707)
  - Possessions in Europe
    - British Cyprus
    - British Malta
    - British Ireland
    - United States of the Ionian Islands
    - British Gibraltar
    - British Minorca
    - British Heligoland
  - Possessions in Africa
    - British Somaliland (1884–1960)
    - British Egypt (1914–1936)
    - Anglo-Egyptian Sudan (1899–1956)
    - East Africa Protectorate (1895–1920)
    - Kenya Colony (1920–1963)
    - Uganda Protectorate (1894–1962)
    - Tanganyika (territory) (1922–1961)
    - Protectorate of Nyasaland (1893–1964)
    - Protectorate of Northern Rhodesia (1924–1964)
    - Colony of Southern Rhodesia (1923–1965), (1979–1980)
    - Bechuanaland Protectorate (1885–1966)
    - Basutoland(1884–1966)
    - Swaziland(1906–1968)
    - British Nigeria (1914–1954)
    - British Gold Coast (1867–1957)
    - British Sierra Leone (1808–1961)
    - British Gambia (1821–1965)
  - Possessions in the Americas
    - Thirteen Colonies
    - British West Indies
      - Bahamas
      - Barbados
      - Bermuda
      - Leeward Islands (1671–1816),(1833–1958)
      - Windward Islands (1833–1960)
      - Cayman Islands
      - Colony of Jamaica (1655–1962)
      - Trinidad and Tobago
      - Turks and Caicos Islands
    - British Honduras (1862–1981)
    - British Guiana (1814–1966)
    - Kingdom of Mosquitia (1638–1860)
  - Possessions in South Asia
    - East India Company (1757–1858)
    - India (1858–1947)
    - Ceylon (1815–1948)
    - Sikkim (protectorate) (1861–1948)
  - Possessions in East Asia
    - British Hong Kong (1841–1997)
  - Possessions in the Middle East
    - Trucial States (1820–1971)
    - British Bahrain (1861–1971)
    - British Qatar (1916–1971)
    - British Iraq (1920–1932) (1932–1958)
    - Emirate of Transjordan (1921–1946)
    - Mandatory Palestine (1920–1948)
    - Sheikhdom of Kuwait (1899–1961)
    - Aden Protectorate (1872–1963)
    - Muscat and Oman (1892–1970)
  - Possessions in Southeast Asia
    - British Bencoolen
    - British Malaya
    - British Borneo
  - Dominions of the United Kingdom
    - Dominion of Canada (1867–present)
      - Canada a colony that gradually increased its independence in 1867, 1931, and 1982.
    - Dominion of Newfoundland (incorporated into the Dominion of Canada in 1949)
    - States and territories of Australia (1901–present)
      - Australia itself a colony that gradually increased its independence in 1901, 1942, and 1986, was tasked with the government of multiple other British colonies and territories and the mandates of New Guinea and Nauru
    - Realm of New Zealand (1907–present)
      - New Zealand itself a colony that gradually increased its independence in 1907, 1947 and 1986, was tasked with the government of multiple other British colonies and territories and the mandate of Samoa. It was also nominal co-trustee of the mandate of Nauru. The remaining non-self-governing New Zealand territory is Tokelau.
    - Mandates under South African administration (1915–1990)
      - The South-West Africa mandate was governed by the Union of South Africa, that itself a colony that gradually increased its independence in 1910, 1931 and 1961.
- (Denmark) Danish Empire (1620–1979)
  - (Denmark) Danish India (1620–1869)
  - (Denmark) Danish Gold Coast (1658–1850)
  - Danish colonization of the Americas:
    - Danish West Indies (1754–1917)
    - Greenland (1814–1979)
- Dutch Empire (1602–1975/present)
  - Dutch colonization of the Americas by Dutch West India Company:
    - New Netherland
    - Dutch Guyana/Surinam
    - Dutch Brazil (1630–1654)
    - Dutch Caribbean
    - Dutch Gold Coast (1612–1872)
  - Dutch East India Company
    - Dutch India
    - Dutch East Indies
      - Netherlands New Guinea
    - Dutch Cape Colony (1652–1806)
    - Dutch Formosa (1624–1662)
    - Dutch Ceylon (1640–1796)
    - Dutch Malacca (1641–1795) (1818–1825)
    - Dejima (1641–1854)
    - Dutch Mauritius (1638–1710)
- French Empire (1534–1980/present)
  - French colonization of the Americas:
    - France Antarctique (1555–1567)
    - New France (1534–1763) and Quebec
    - French Louisiana
    - French West Indies (1635–today)
      - Îles des Saintes (1648–present)
      - Marie-Galante (1635–present)
      - la Désirade (1635–present)
      - Guadeloupe (1635–present)
      - Martinique (1635–present)
    - French Guiana
    - Saint Pierre and Miquelon
  - Asia:
    - French India (1664–1962)
    - French Indochina and French Indochinese Union (1887–1954)
      - Laos (protectorate) (1893–1953)
      - Cambodia (protectorate) (1863–1953)
      - Vietnam
        - Cochinchina (Southern Vietnam) (1858–1949)
        - Annam (protectorate) (Central Vietnam) (1883–1949)
        - Tonkin (protectorate) (Northern Vietnam) (1884–1949)
    - China
      - The foreign concessions : French Concession of Shanghai (1849–1946), Tianjin (1860–1946) and Hankou (1898–1946)
      - The spheres of French influence officially recognized by China on the provinces of Yunnan, Guangxi, Hainan, and Guangdong
      - Shamian Island (1859–1949) (a fifth of the island)
      - French Guangzhouwan (1898–1945)
  - Possessions in the Middle East
    - Mandate for Syria and Lebanon (1920–1946)
  - French Africa:
    - French North Africa (1830–1934)
    - French Algeria
    - French Morocco (1912–1956)
    - French Tunisia (1886–1956)
    - French Somaliland (1883–1975)
    - French West Africa (1895–1958)
    - French Madagascar (1882–1958)
    - French Comoros (1866–1968)
    - French Equatorial Africa (1910–1958)
    - Isle de France (1715–1810)
    - Seychelles (1756–1810)
    - The Scattered Islands
    - (Réunion) Reunion (1710–present)
    - Mayotte (1841–present)
  - Oceania:
    - New Hebrides (1906–1980)
    - French Polynesia
    - New Caledonia
    - Wallis and Futuna
    - Clipperton Island
- German Empire (1884–1920)
  - Kamerun (1884–1918)
  - Togoland (1884–1916)
  - German South West Africa (1884–1919)
  - German New Guinea (1884–1919)
  - German East Africa (1885–1919)
  - German Samoa (1900–1920)
  - German Concession in Tientsin
  - German concession of Hankou
  - German Tsingtao
    - German Kiautschou Bay Leased Territory
- List of former German colonies (1528 - 1945)
- (Italy) Italian Empire (1882–1960)
  - Eritrea (1882–1947)
  - Somaliland (1889–1947, 1950–1960 as Italian Trust Territory of Somaliland)
  - Ethiopia (1936–1941)
    - Italian East Africa (formed by merging Eritrea, Somaliland and Ethiopia: 1936–1947)
  - Cyrenaica (1912–1947)
  - Tripolitania (1912–1947)
    - Libya (Formed by merging Cyrenaica and Tripolitania in 1934. It dissolved in 1947. It also included the Southern Military Territory of Fezzan)
  - Italian Islands of the Aegean (1912–1947)
  - Italian Albania (1939–1943)
  - Italian France (1940–1943)
  - Italian Montenegro (1941–1943)
  - Italian concession of Tientsin (1901–1947)
- (Portugal) Portuguese Empire (1415–1999)
  - Evolution of the Portuguese Empire
  - Portuguese colonization of the Americas
    - Colonial Brazil (1500–1815)
  - Portuguese India (1505–1961)
  - Portuguese Ceylon (1598–1658)
  - Portuguese Timor (1702–1975)
  - Portuguese Macau (1557–1999)
  - Portuguese Malacca (1511–1641)
  - Portuguese Nagasaki (1580–1587)
  - Portuguese Oman (1507–1656)
  - Tamão (1514–1521)
  - Portuguese Africa
    - Portuguese East Africa (1498–1975)
    - Portuguese West Africa (1575–1975)
    - Portuguese Guinea (1474–1974) (1974–1975)
    - Portuguese Cape Verde (1462–1975)
    - Portuguese São Tomé and Príncipe (1470–1975)
    - Fort of São João Baptista de Ajudá (1721–1961)
    - Portuguese Gold Coast (1482–1642)
- Russian Empire (1721–1917)
  - Siberia
  - Caucasus
  - Central Asia
  - Russian colonization of North America:
    - Russian America (1733–1867)
  - Sagallo (1889)
  - Russian Port Arthur
  - Russian concession in Tientsin
- Spanish Empire (1492–1976/present)
  - Spanish colonization of the Americas
    - Viceroyalty of New Spain
    - (Spain) Viceroyalty of Peru
    - (Spain) Viceroyalty of New Granada
    - (Spain) Viceroyalty of the Río de la Plata
  - (Spain) Spanish East Indies
    - (Spain) Captaincy General of the Philippines (1565–1898)
    - (Spain) Spanish Malukus (1580–1663)
    - (Spain) Spanish protectorate in Cambodia (1597–1600)
    - (Spain) El Piñal (1598–1600)
    - (Spain) Spanish Formosa (1626–1642)
  - (Spain) Spanish Africa
    - Canary Islands (1496–present)
    - Spanish Guinea (1778–1968)
    - Spanish Sahara (1884–1976)
    - Spanish protectorate in Morocco (1912–1956)
    - Ifni (1476–1524/1859–1969).
    - Plazas de soberanía (Enclaves in North Africa)
      - (Spain) Santa Cruz de la Mar Pequeña (1478–1524)
      - (Spain) Spanish Mazalquivir (1505–1708, 1732–1792)
      - (Spain) Spanish Oran (1509–1708, 1732–1792)
      - (Spain) Spanish Tripoli (1510–1530)
      - (Spain) Spanish Béjaïa (1510–1555)
      - (Spain) Peñón de Algiers (1510–1529)
      - (Spain) Spanish Tunisia (1535–1569, 1573–1574)
      - (Spain) Spanish Larache (1610–1689)
      - (Spain) Peñón de Vélez de la Gomera (1508–present)
      - (Spain) Melilla (1497–present)
      - (Spain) Ceuta (1578/1668–present)
  - Possessions of the Catholic Monarchs of Spain, Habsburg Spain and Spanish House of Bourbon in Europe:
    - (Spain) Spanish Burgundian lands
      - (Spain) Spanish Netherlands (1555–1713)
        - (Spain) Spanish Holland (1555–1581)
        - (Spain) Spanish Belgium (1555–1713)
        - (Spain) Spanish Luxembourg (1555–1713)
      - Franche-Comté (1555–1678)
      - Charolais (1555–1678)
      - (Spain) Upper Alsace (1617–1648)
      - (Spain) Spanish Palatinate (1620–1652)
    - (Spain) (Spain) Spanish Italy
      - Kingdom of Sardinia (1479–1713, 1717–1720)
      - Kingdom of Sicily (1479–1713, 1734–1815)
      - Kingdom of Naples (1503–1713, 1734–1806)
      - Principality of Monaco (1524–1641)
      - (Spain) State of the Presidi (1557–1708)
      - (Spain) Duchy of Milan (1559–1706)
      - (Spain) Marquisate of Finale (1602–1713)
      - (Spain) Spanish Grischun (1620–1639)
      - (Spain) Principality of Piombino (1628–1634)
      - Duchy of Parma and Piacenza (1734–1738, 1748–1796, 1847–1854)
      - Kingdom of Etruria (1801–1807)
      - Duchy of Lucca (1815–1847)
      - Kingdom of the Two Sicilies (1815–1860)
- Swedish Empire (1638–1663, 1733, 1784–1878)
  - Swedish colonies in the Americas
    - New Sweden (1638–1655)
    - Swedish colony of Saint Barthélemy (1784–1878)
    - (Sweden) Guadeloupe (1813–1814)
  - Swedish Gold Coast (1650–1658, 1660–1663)
  - Swedish Africa Company
  - (Sweden) Swedish East India Company
  - (Sweden) Parangipettai (1733)
  - (Sweden) Swedish Factory, Canton Factories (1757–1860)

=== Asian ===
- Empire of Japan (1868–1945)
  - Ezo as Hokkaido (1869–present)
  - Ryukyu as Okinawa Prefecture (1879–1945; 1972–present)
  - Taiwan (1895–1945)
  - Karafuto Prefecture (1905–1949)
  - (Empire of Japan) Korea (1910–1945)
  - South Seas Mandate (1919–1947)
  - Manchukuo (1932–1945)
  - (Empire of Japan) Greater East Asia Co-Prosperity Sphere (1932–1945)
- (Turkey) Ottoman Empire (1354–1908)
  - Europe:
    - Cretan State (1898–1913)
    - Crimean Khanate (1475–1774)
    - Ottoman Albania (1479–1912)
    - Ottoman Bosnia and Herzegovina (1463–1908)
    - Ottoman Bulgaria (1396–1878)
    - Ottoman Crete (1667–1898)
    - Ottoman Cyprus (1571–1878)
    - Ottoman Greece (1453–1830)
    - Ottoman Hungary (1541–1699)
    - Ottoman Serbia (1459–1804)
    - Rumelia Eyalet (1365–1867)
    - Sanjak of Rhodes (1522–1912)
    - United Principalities of Moldavia and Wallachia (1859–1862)
  - Asia:
    - Protectorate of Aceh (1496–1903)
    - Ottoman Arabia (1517–1919)
    - Ottoman Iraq (1538–1918)
    - Ottoman Syria (1517–1918)
    - Emirate of Nejd (1818–1914)
  - Africa:
    - Khedivate of Egypt (1867–1914)
    - Turco-Egyptian Sudan (1820–1885)
    - Ottoman Egypt (1517–1914)
    - Ottoman Absinia (1554–1872)
    - Ottoman Algeria (1516–1830)
    - Ottoman Tripolitania (1551–1912)
    - Ottoman Tunisia (1574–1881)

=== Other countries with possessions ===
- United States (1857–present)
  - United States overseas territories:
    - (United States) Minor Outlying Islands (1857–present)
    - American Samoa (1900–present)
    - Guam (1899–present)
      - Naval Government of Guam (1899–1950)
    - Northern Mariana Islands (1986–present)
    - Puerto Rico (1899–present)
      - (United States) Military Government of Porto Rico (1899–1900)
      - (United States) Insular Government of Porto Rico (1900–1952)
    - United States Virgin Islands (1917–present)
    - Philippines (1899–1946)
      - (United States) Military Government of the Philippine Islands (1899–1902)
      - (Philippines) Insular Government of the Philippine Islands (1902–1935)
      - Commonwealth of the Philippines (1935–1946)
    - Republic of Hawaii (1898–1900)
    - Swan Islands (1863–1972)
  - U.S.-administered areas:
    - Canton and Enderbury Islands (1939–1979)
    - Corn Islands (1914–1971)
    - Nanpō Islands and Marcus Island (1952–1968)
    - (Panama Canal Zone) Panama Canal (Zone) (1903–1999)
    - (United States) Ryukyu Islands and Daitō Islands (1952–1972)
    - Trust Territory of the Pacific Islands (1947–1994)
- Mexico
  - Clipperton Island
- Argentina
  - Antártida Argentina
  - Islas Malvinas (1829–1831, 1832–1833, 1982)
- Chile (1888–1966)
  - Easter Island
- (Austrian Empire) Habsburg monarchy Colonies and the (Austria-Hungary) Austro-Hungarian Empire (1719–1750, 1778–1783, 1901–1917)
  - Austrian colonial policy
    - Ostend Company
      - Bankipur (Bengal)
      - Covelong
    - Austrian East India Company
      - Austrian colonisation of Nicobar Islands (1778–1785)
      - Austrian Delagoa Bay (1773–1781)
      - Móric Benyovszky's Madagascar (1774–1779)
      - Austrian North Borneo
  - Franz Josef Land
  - Austro-Hungarian concession of Tianjin (1901–1917)
  - Hungarian colonial attempts
- (Holy Roman Empire) German colonial initiatives (1683–1721)
  - Colonies of Brandenburg-Prussia (1683–1721)
  - Colonies of County of Hanau
  - Neu-Askania (1828–1856)
  - German colonization of the Americas
    - Klein-Venedig (1528–1546)
- Polish attempts and Curonian colonisation
  - Colonization attempts by Poland
  - Curonian colonisation
- (Holy Roman Empire) Pre-unification Italian colonialism
  - Grand Duchy of Tuscany: Thornton expedition (1608–1609)
  - Kingdom of Sicily: Kingdom of Africa (1135–1160)
  - Knights Hospitaller (Malta, a vassal of the Kingdom of Sicily): Hospitaller colonization of the Americas
  - Republic of Genoa: Genoese colonies
  - Republic of Venice: Stato da Màr
- Kingdom of Scotland (1621–1707)
  - Scottish colonization of the Americas
- Kingdom of Norway
  - List of possessions of Norway (1920–present)
  - Erik the Red's Land
  - Norway Antarctic and sub-Antarctic possessions (1927–1957)
- Omani Empire (1652–1892)
  - Yaruba dynasty (1624–1742)
  - Sultanate of Muscat (1652–1820)
  - Sultanate of Zanzibar (taken by Oman in 1698, became capital of the Omani Sultanate or Empire from 1632 or 1640; until 1890)
  - Mombasa (1698–1728, 1729–1744, 1837–1890)
  - Gwadar (1783–1958)
- Senussiya
  - Borkou
- (Ottoman Tripolitania) (Beylik of Tunis) (Regency of Algiers) Barbary states Island Colonies
  - Lundy (1625-1635)
  - Comino (1551-1798)
  - Lampedusa
- Chinese Empire (from Qin dynasty to (China) Qing dynasty), (221 BC – 1911)
  - - Imperial Chinese Tributary System
    - Guangxi
    - Hainan (since the Han dynasty)
      - Nansha Islands
      - Xisha Islands
    - Manchuria (during the Tang, Liao, Jin, Yuan, Ming, and Qing dynasties)
      - Manchuria (Northeast China)
      - Outer Manchuria
        - Kuye Island
    - Korea
      - Canghai Commandery(A commandery that self subjugated to Han dynasty from Dongye)
      - Four Commanderies of Han (Established after the fall of Gojoseon)
      - Daifang Commandery (Offshoot of the former four commanderies of Han that existed in the 3rd to 4th century)
      - Colonization attempts of the Tang dynasty after Unification of the three kingdoms of Korea (Gyerim Territory Area Command, Protectorate General to Pacify the East and Ungjin Commandery)
      - Dongnyeong Prefectures, Ssangseong Prefectures and Tamna prefectures (Yuan dynasty)
      - Chinese concession of Incheon (during the Qing dynasty)
    - Inner Mongolia
    - Outer Mongolia (during for example the Tang and Qing dynasties)
      - Tannu Uriankhai
    - Taiwan (during the Qing dynasty)
    - Tibet (during the Yuan and Qing dynasties)
    - Yunnan
    - Vietnam (from the Han to Tang dynasties, and during the early Ming dynasty)
    - Xinjiang
    - Central Asia (during the Tang and Qing dynasties)
      - Protectorate General to Pacify the West
- (Ethiopian Empire) Ethiopian colonies as the Aksum Empire and Abyssinian empire
  - Viceroyalty of Yemen (520–578)
  - Ethiopian South-Eastern colonization (1878–present)
    - Ethiopian Somali
    - Oromia
    - Gambela
    - Southern Nations
  - Ethiopian-Eritrean/Eritrea Province (1952–1993)
- Persian Empires
  - Oman (5th century BC–628; 1743–1747)
  - Bahrain (5th century BC–629; 1077–1253, 1330–1507)
  - Sasanian Yemen (570–628)
  - Bijapur Sultan (1490–1686)
  - Persianization of regions within Greater Iran
- Arab proto-colonialism (Rashidun Caliphate, Umayyad Caliphate and Abbasid Caliphate)
  - Umayyad Al-Andalus (Arab Hispania)
    - Umayyad Gaul (Arab Southern France)
  - Arab Maghreb
  - Aghlabids colonies from Ifriqiya
    - Southern Italy
      - Emirate of Sicily
      - Emirate of Bari
      - Malta
  - Al-Jazira (Arab Mesopotamia)
    - Al-Awasim
  - Arab Iran
    - Arabistan
    - Khamseh
  - Arab Central Asian
    - Arab Khorasan
  - Arminiya (Arab Caucasus)
- (Chola dynasty) Chola Empire
  - Srivijaya
  - Sri Lanka
- Sikh Empire (1799–1849)
  - Jammu and Kashmir (princely state) (1819–1846)
  - Khyber Pakhtunkhwa (1834–1849)

== See also ==
- Analysis of Western European colonialism and colonization
- Colonial troops
- Empire
- Great Divergence
- Hegemony
- History of Western civilization
- Imperialism
- List of ancient great powers
- List of largest empires
- List of medieval great powers
- List of modern great powers
- Middle Eastern empires
- Nomadic empire
- The empire on which the sun never sets
