= List of former European colonies =

This is a list of former European colonies.

== North America ==
=== Denmark ===
- Danish West Indies
- Greenland
  - Colony of Greenland
    - County of Greenland
  - North Greenland
  - South Greenland

=== France ===
- New France
  - Canada
    - Acadia
      - Île-Royale
  - Illinois
  - Louisiana
- Saint-Domingue

=== Great Britain and England ===
- British America (New Britain)
  - Canada
    - Island of St. John
    - Lower Canada
      - Province of Quebec
    - Upper Canada
    - Newfoundland Colony
  - "Thirteen Colonies" (The United States of America)
    - New England Colonies:
      - Province of Massachusetts Bay
      - Province of New Hampshire
      - Colony of Rhode Island and Providence Plantations
      - Connecticut Colony
    - Province of New York
    - Province of New Jersey
    - Province of Pennsylvania
    - Delaware Colony
    - Province of Maryland
    - Colony of Virginia
    - Province of North Carolina
    - Province of South Carolina
    - Province of Georgia
  - Other North American colonies
    - Province of East Florida
    - Province of West Florida
- British Honduras
- Bay Islands

=== Netherlands ===
- New Netherland (Nieuw-Amsterdam / New York)

=== Norway ===
- Greenland

=== Russia ===
- Russian Alaska

=== Scotland ===
- Nova Scotia
- Darien

=== Spain and Castile ===
==== Viceroyalty of New Spain ====
- Kingdom of New Galicia
  - Province of Alta California
  - Province of Old California
  - Province of Colotlán and Nayarit
  - Province of Guadalajara in New Galicia
  - Province of Zacatecas
  - Province of Arizpe
  - Province of Durango
  - Province of Texas
  - Province of Coahuila
  - Province of New León
  - Province of New Santander
  - Province of New Mexico
- Kingdom of México
  - Province of Guanajuato
  - Province of México
  - Province of Oaxaca
  - Province of Puebla
  - Province of San Luis Potosí
  - Province of Tabasco
  - Province of Valladolid de Michoacán
  - Province of Veracruz
  - Province of Tlaxcala
  - Province of Laguna de los Términos
  - Province of Mérida in Yucatán
- Kingdom of Santo Domingo
  - Captaincy General of Cuba
    - Province of Florida
    - Province of Louisiana
  - Province of Puerto Rico
- Kingdom of Guatemala
  - Province of Costa Rica
  - Province of Guatemala
  - Province of San Salvador
  - Province of Comayagua
  - Province of Chiapas

==== Viceroyalty of New Granada ====
- Kingdom of Tierra Firme
  - Province of Darién
  - Province of Panamá
  - Province of Portobelo
  - Province of Veraguas

=== Sweden ===
- New Sweden
- St. Barthelemy

== Caribbean ==
=== Brandenburg ===
- St Thomas

=== Courland ===
- New Courland (Tobago)

=== Denmark–Norway ===
- Saint John
- Saint Thomas
- Saint Croix

=== France ===
- Anguilla
- Antigua and Barbuda
- Dominica
- Grenada
- Montserrat
- Nevis
- Saint Christophe (St Kitts)
- Saint Croix
- Saint-Domingue (Hispaniola)
- Sainte-Lucia (St Lucia)
- Saint Vincent and the Grenadines
- Sint Eustatius
- Tobago

=== Knights of Malta ===
- Saint Barthélemy
- Saint Martin
- Saint Christopher (St Kitts)
- Saint Croix
- Tortuga (off coast of Haiti)

=== Netherlands ===
- New Walcheren (Tobago)

=== Spain and Castile ===
==== Viceroyalty of New Spain ====
- Kingdom of Santo Domingo
  - Province of Santo Domingo
  - Captaincy General of Cuba
    - Province of Havana
    - Province of Santiago de Cuba
    - Province of Florida
    - Province of Louisiana
  - Province of Jamaica
  - Province of Puerto Rico

==== Viceroyalty of New Granada ====
- Kingdom of New Granada
  - Province of Cartagena de Indias
    - San Andrés y Providencia Islands
- Kingdom of Venezuela
  - Province of Trinidad

=== Sweden ===
- Saint-Barthélemy

=== Sweden–Norway ===
- Cooper Island
- Saint-Barthélemy (1814–1878)

=== United Kingdom ===
- The Bahamas
- Barbados
- Belize
- Jamaica
- Leeward Islands
  - Antigua and Barbuda
  - Dominica
  - Saint Christopher (St Kitts)-Nevis
- Trinidad and Tobago
- Windward Islands
  - Grenada
  - Saint Lucia
  - Saint Vincent and the Grenadines

== South America ==
=== Augsburg/Nuremberg ===
- Welserland (Venezuela)

=== France ===
- Brazil (Rio de Janeiro briefly, and São Luís briefly)

(see France Antarctique and France Équinoxiale)

- Iles Malouines (Falkland Islands)

=== Netherlands ===
- Berbice (Guyana)
- Demerara
  - Dutch colonisation of the Guianas, overview
- Surinam (Suriname)
- Essequibo
- New Holland (Brazil – Half the captaincies)

=== Portugal ===
- Brazil
- Cisplatina (Uruguay)
- Sacramento
- Misiones Orientales

=== Spain and Castile ===
Early colonial governorates

- Kingdom of Tierra Firme
- Governorate of New Andalusia
- Governorate of Castilla de Oro
- Governorate of New Castile
- Governorate of New Toledo
- Governorate of New León
- Governorate of New Andalusia

==== Viceroyalty of New Granada ====
- Kingdom of New Granada
  - Province of Antioquia
  - Province of Cartagena de Indias
  - Province of Casanare
  - Province of Chocó
  - Province of New Pamplona
  - Province of Mariquita
  - Province of Neiva
  - Province of San Faustino
  - Province of Santa Fe de Bogotá
  - Province of Riohacha
  - Province of Santa Marta
  - Province of Socorro
  - Province of Tunja
- Kingdom of Quito
  - Province of Quito
  - Province of Macas
  - Province of Guayaquil
  - Province of Jaén de Bracamoros
  - Province of Maynas
  - Province of Cuenca
  - Province of Popayán
- Kingdom of Venezuela
  - Province of Caracas
  - Province of Barinas
  - Province of Maracaibo
  - Province of Margarita
  - Province of Trinidad
  - Province of Cumaná
  - Province of Guayana

==== Viceroyalty of Peru ====
- Kingdom of Perú
  - Province of Lima
  - Province of Huancavelica
  - Province of Arequipa
  - Province of Huamanga
  - Province of Tarma
  - Province of Trujillo
- Kingdom of Chile
  - Province of Santiago de Chile
  - Province of Concepción
  - Province of Chiloé
  - Province of Araucanía

==== Viceroyalty of the Río de la Plata ====
- Kingdom of Charcas
  - Province of Chuquisaca
  - Province of Cochabamba
  - Province of La Paz
  - Province of Potosí
  - Province of Chiquitos
  - Province of Moxos
  - Upper Peru
- Kingdom of Buenos Aires
  - Province of Paraguay
  - Province of Buenos Aires
  - Province of the Guaraní Missions
  - Province of Montevideo
  - Province of Córdoba
  - Province of Salta

=== United Kingdom ===
- British Guiana
  - Berbice, Essequibo, Demerara
- Surinam

== Africa ==
=== Belgium ===
- Belgian Congo (Democratic Republic of the Congo)
- Ruanda-Urundi (Rwanda and Burundi)

=== Brandenburg ===
- Arguin (in Mauritania)
- Brandenburger Gold Coast (coastal settlements in Ghana)

=== Courland ===
- St. Andrews Island (in the Gambia)

=== Denmark-Norway ===
- Danish Gold Coast (coastal settlements in Ghana)

=== France ===
- Albreda (in The Gambia)
- Comoros
- French Dahomey (Benin)
- French Algeria
- French Cameroon (91% of modern Cameroon)
- French Chad
- French Congo (Republic of the Congo)
- French Guinea (Guinea)
- French Upper Volta (Republic of Upper Volta, Burkina Faso)
- French Somaliland (Djibouti)
- French Sudan (Mali)
- French Togoland (Togo)
- French Madagascar
- Gabon
- Ivory Coast (Côte d'Ivoire)
- Colonial Mauritania
- French protectorate in Morocco (89% of Morocco)
- Oubangui-Chari (Central African Republic)
- Senegal
- Senegambia and Niger
  - Upper Senegal and Niger
  - Colony of Niger
- French protectorate of Tunisia

=== Germany ===
- German East Africa (Burundi, Rwanda, Tanzania)
- German South-West Africa (Namibia)
- Kamerun (split between Cameroon and Nigeria)
- Togoland (split between Togo and Ghana)
- Wituland (Lamu Island, owned by Kenya)

=== Hospitaller Malta ===
- Tripoli

=== Italy ===
- Italian East Africa
  - Italian Eritrea
  - Italian Somaliland (now Somalia)
- Italian Libya

=== Netherlands ===
- Arguin Island (in Mauritania)
- Dutch Cape Colony
- Dutch Gold Coast (settlements along coast of Ghana, including El Mina)
- Dutch Loango-Angola (Luanda, Sonyo and Cabinda)
- Gorée (Senegal)
- Moçambique (Delagoa Bay)
- São Tomé
- South Africa
- Mauritius

=== Portugal ===
- Ajuda (Whydah, in Benin)
- Portuguese Angola
- Annobón
- Cabinda
- Cape Verde (Cabo Verde)
- Fort of São João Baptista de Ajudá
- Gorée (in Senegal)
- Malindi
- Mombasa
- Algarve Ultramar (Morocco)
  - Agadir
  - Alcacer Ceguer
  - Arzila
  - Azamor
  - Mazagan
  - Mogador
  - Safim
- Nigeria (Lagos area)
- Mozambique
- Portuguese Gold Coast (settlements along coast of Ghana)
- Portuguese Guinea (Guinea-Bissau)
- Quíloa
- São Tomé and Príncipe
- Tangier
- Zanzibar
- Ziguinchor

=== Spain ===
- Bona
- Bougie
- Jerba
- Fernando Po and Annobon (insular Equatorial Guinea)
- Oran
- Port Guinea
- Río Muni (mainland Equatorial Guinea)
- Spanish Protectorate in Morocco
- Spanish West Africa
  - Río de Oro
  - Saguia el-Hamra
  - Tarfaya Strip
  - Ifni

=== Sweden ===
- Swedish Gold Coast (coastal settlements in Ghana)

=== United Kingdom ===
- Anglo-Egyptian Sudan (Sudan)
- Basutoland (Lesotho)
- Balleland (Benin)
- Bechuanaland (Botswana)
- British East Africa (Kenya)
- British Somaliland (Somaliland)
- British Togoland (eastern Ghana)
- British Cameroon (split between Nigeria and Cameroon)
- British Mauritius
- British Egypt
  - Khedivate of Egypt
  - Sultanate of Egypt
  - Kingdom of Egypt
- Gambia Colony and Protectorate
- Gold Coast (Ghana)
- Colonial Nigeria
  - Niger Coast Protectorate
  - Northern Nigeria Protectorate
  - Southern Nigeria Protectorate
  - Colony and Protectorate of Nigeria
- Northern Rhodesia (Zambia)
- Nyasaland (Malawi)
- Sierra Leone Colony and Protectorate
- Union of South Africa
  - British Cape Colony
  - Natal Colony
  - Orange River Colony
  - Transvaal Colony
- South West Africa (Namibia)
  - Walvis Bay
- Southern Rhodesia (Zimbabwe)
- Swaziland (Eswatini)
- Tanganyika Territory (mainland Tanzania)
- Uganda Protectorate
- Sultanate of Zanzibar (insular Tanzania)

== West Asia ==
=== France ===
- Syria
- Lebanon

=== Netherlands ===
- Yemen (Mokha)
- Mesopotamia (Iraq, Basra)

=== Portugal ===
- Aden
- Bandar Abbas (Iran)
- Hormuz
- Manama (Bahrain)
- Muharraq Island (Bahrain)
- Muscat (Oman)
- Qeshm

=== United Kingdom ===
- Aden Protectorate
- Bahrain
- Cyprus
- Mandatory Iraq
- Sheikhdom of Kuwait
- Muscat and Oman
- Mandatory Palestine
- Qatar
- South Arabia
- Emirate of Transjordan
- Trucial States

== South Asia ==
=== Indian Ocean Area ===
==== Austria ====
- Banquibazar & Cabelon
- Nicobar Islands

==== France ====
- French Comoros
- Isle de France (now Mauritius)
- French Madagascar
- French Seychelles

==== Netherlands ====
- Dutch Mauritius (now Mauritius)

==== Portugal ====
- Laccadive Islands (Lakshadweep)
- Malé (Maldives)
- Socotra

==== United Kingdom ====
- Mauritius
- Seychelles
- Maldives

=== Mainland ===
==== Denmark-Norway ====
- Frederik Oerne Islands (Nicobar Islands)
- Serampore
- Tranquebar

==== France ====
- French India
  - Pondicherry
  - Karikal
  - Yanaon
  - Mahé
  - Chandernagore

==== Netherlands ====
- Dutch Bengal
- Dutch Ceylon
- Dutch India (Dutch Bengal, Suratte, Malabar, Coromandel)

==== Portugal ====
- Bombay
- Calicut
- Cambay
- Cannanore
- Ceilão
- Chaul
- Chittagong
- Cochin
- Dadra and Nagar Haveli
- Daman and Diu
- Goa
- Hughli
- Masulipatnam
- Mangalore
- Pegu
- Surat
- Syriam

==== Sweden ====
- Parangipettai

==== United Kingdom ====
- Territories of the EIC till 1858
- Territories of the British Raj after 1858

== Asia-Pacific ==
=== Austria ===
- North Borneo

=== France ===
- East Asia
- Indochina
  - Cambodia
  - Laos
  - Vietnam
    - Annam
    - Cochinchina
    - Tonkin

=== Germany ===
- German New Guinea
  - Bismarck Archipelago
  - Caroline Islands (Karolinen)
  - Kaiser-Wilhelmsland
  - North Solomon Islands
- Gilbert Islands
- German Samoa
- Marshall Islands
- Nauru
- Northern Marianas Islands (Marianen)
- Palau

=== Netherlands ===
- Dutch East Indies (Indonesia)
- Dutch New Guinea (Western Part of Papua, Indonesia)
- Malacca
- Dutch Formosa

=== Portugal ===
- Flores
- Macau
- Malacca
- Moluccas
  - Ambon
  - Ternate
  - Tidore
- Portuguese Timor (Timor-Leste)
- Solor

=== Spain ===
- Spanish East Indies
  - Philippines
  - Marianas Islands
    - Guam
    - Northern Marianas Islands
  - Caroline Islands
- Marshall Islands

=== United Kingdom ===
- British Burma
- Australia
  - New South Wales
  - Queensland
  - South Australia
  - Swan River Colony/Western Australia
  - Van Diemen's Land (Tasmania)
  - Victoria
- British Solomon Islands
- Christmas Island
- Cocos Islands
- Colonial Fiji
- Gilbert and Ellice Islands (Kiribati & Tuvalu)
- Kingdom of Rarotonga (Cook Islands)
- New Zealand
  - Auckland Islands
- Niue
- Norfolk Island
- Territory of Papua and New Guinea
- Territory of New Guinea
- Western Samoa
- Phoenix Islands (part of Kiribati)
- Solomon Islands
- Territory of Papua
- Tokelau
- Tonga
- Southeast Asia
  - Malaysia
  - British Malaya
    - Federated Malay States
    - Straits Settlements
    - Unfederated Malay States
  - British Borneo
    - North Borneo
    - Kingdom of Sarawak
- Brunei
- Singapore
- China
  - Hong Kong

== Europe ==
=== Denmark ===
- Iceland

=== Italy ===
- Albania
- Dodecanese

=== Spain ===
- Spanish Netherlands
- Duchy of Milan
- Kingdom of Naples
- Kingdom of Sicily

=== Norway ===
- Iceland
- Faroe Islands
- Isle of Man, Northern Isles, Hebrides

=== United Kingdom ===
- Cyprus
- Ionian islands (now part of Greece)
- Ireland
- Malta
- Menorca (now part of Spain)
- Heligoland (now part of Germany)

== See also ==
- Austrian colonial policy
- Belgian colonial empire
- British colonial empire
- Danish colonial empire
- Dutch colonial empire
- French colonial empire
- German colonial empire
- List of former German colonies
- Italian colonial empire
- Portuguese colonial empire
- Evolution of the Portuguese Empire
- Russian colonial empire
- Spanish colonial empire
- Swedish colonial empire
