= Edlinger =

Edlinger is a surname. Notable people with the surname include:

- Carina Edlinger (born 1998), Austrian Paralympic cross-country skier
- Johann Georg Edlinger (1741–1819), Austrian portrait painter
- Patrick Edlinger (1960–2012), professional French free climber
- Rudolf Edlinger (1940–2021), Social Democratic Party of Austria politician and a former Austrian Minister of Finance (1997–2000)
