= Heinrich Zimmermann =

Johann Heinrich Zimmermann (1741–1805) sailed on HMS Discovery on James Cook's third voyage to the Pacific (1776–1780) and wrote an account of the voyage, Reise um die Welt mit Capitain Cook (Mannheim, 1781). In 1782 he was invited by William Bolts to join a voyage to the North West Coast of America sailing from Trieste under the Imperial Austrian flag. He subsequently commanded the Austrian East India Company ships Concordia and Edward on voyages to India.

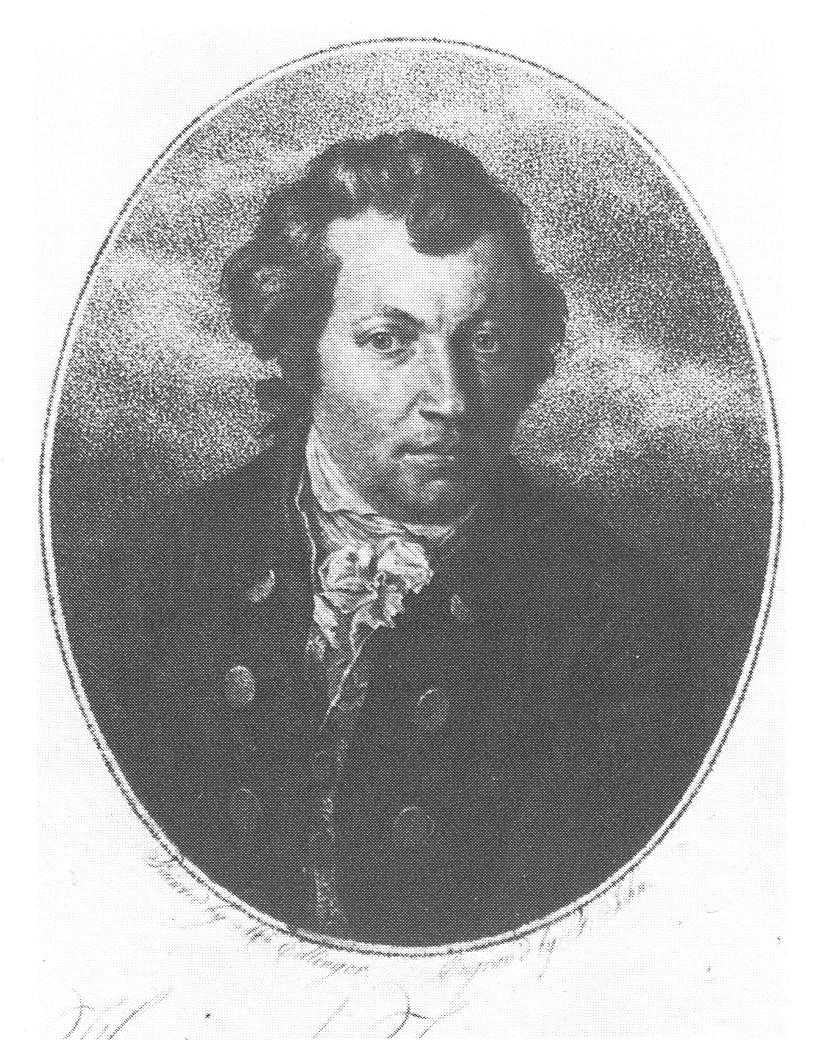
Heinrich Zimmermann, Etching of the Portrait by Johann Georg Edlinger in Friedrich John Gallerie denkwürdiger Baiern, München, Fleischmann, 1807.

== Biography ==
Johann Heinrich Zimmermann was born on 25 December 1741 in Wiesloch, a short distance south of Heidelberg in the Palatinate. Leaving home in 1770, Zimmermann had a variety of jobs around Europe. He had trained as a Gürtler, a worker in precious and non-precious metals who made ornaments, jewelry, cutlery, including swords, metal tools and implements. He spent time working at this in Geneva, Lyons and Paris.

He arrived in London in 1776 where, after a short period of working in a sugar refinery, he joined HMS Discovery as an able seaman on 12 March of that year for James Cook's third voyage to the Pacific. He became the ship's coxswain in July 1776. During the voyage, he kept a concise journal (contrary to orders) written in abbreviated German in a small notebook, which he afterwards used to write an account of it, Reise um die Welt mit Capitain Cook, published in Mannheim in 1781 and in Munich in 1783. He had the help of a friend in writing it, according to Johann Reinhold Forster. A French edition was published in Berne in 1782, and a Dutch edition in 1784. A Russian translation of Zimmermann's account of Cook's last voyage was published in St. Petersburg in 1786 and 1788. The fame generated by the book led to Zimmermann being appointed in August 1781 by the Prince Elector of Bavaria, Karl Theodor, to the position of Churfürstlicher Leibschiffmeister (Master of the Prince Elector's Ships), where he was responsible for the fleet of hunting and excursion boats on Lake Starnberg.

Shortly after arriving at Starnberg, Zimmermann accepted an invitation from William Bolts, made through George Dixon, to join the proposed voyage of the Imperial ship Cobenzell, and obtained leave from the Prince Elector to do so. The voyage of the Cobenzell was to have been an Austrian answer to James Cook’s voyages, an Imperial voyage of discovery round the world which included a venture to exploit the commercial possibilities of the fur trade on the northwest coast of America and trade with China and Japan. Zimmermann was joined in Trieste by three of his former shipmates under Cook, George Dixon, George Gilpin and William Walker, all four to sail as officers on the Cobenzell. Three naturalists, Franz Josef Maerter, Karl Haidinger and Franz Boos, and a gardener, Franz Bredemeyer, were assigned to undertake the scientific tasks of the voyage. Zimmermann's participation in the forthcoming voyage was announced in the Augsburg newspaper, the Augsburgische Ordinari Postzeitung of 2 August 1782:

Munich, 30 July: Mr Zimmermann, of whom it is reported in the Brünner Zeitung under the heading Munich that he made the great voyage around the world with the celebrated Captain Cook and afterwards became Shipmaster in the service of the Elector on the Würmsee some hours distant from here, received some time since letters from the English Captain Digson [Dixon], in which he was invited with very flattering expressions to take part in the forthcoming voyage from Trieste to the East Indies, with a monthly salary of 6 pounds Sterling, for a period of five years, with the assurance that when he completed the voyage he could take part in a second one, in which his rank and character would be better. Mr Zimmermann’s heart was struck by this offer. In ardent enthusiasm he sought His Highness the Elector's gracious permission. Our gracious Prince, attentive above all to scientific talent and genius, acceded in this case to his plea, granting him for the expected five years only his existing yearly salary of 400 gulden and allowed him to be paid half of that to supply him with sufficient travelling money; with which he gave the gracious Father of the Country notice of his departure, having also had his position and salary confirmed. Completely infused with this favour, yesterday he eagerly went with the post to his present destiny.

Although Emperor Joseph II was initially enthusiastic, the venture eventually proved impossible to realize. The opposition of Bolts's Belgian financial partners was a principal cause of its not going ahead, and the Emperor also refused to provide finance for it apart from the expenses of his naturalists: in the autumn of 1782 it was abandoned. Bolts sent the Cobenzell in September 1783 on a commercial voyage to the India by way of Marseilles, where she took in the principal part of her cargo, Madeira and the Cape of Good Hope. Zimmermann sailed on the ship as far as Marseilles, where he was employed by Bolts in the fitting out of the Ferdinand, a ship Bolts planned to send to the northwest coast of America under the flag of the Kingdom of Naples. Although King Ferdinand IV of Naples gave Bolts a charter for a Royal Indian Company of Naples (Regia Società del India di Napoli), the hopes for a voyage to the North West Coast under the Neapolitan flag in the Ferdinand came to nought.

In May 1787, Zimmermann found employment with the Brussels banker and merchant Edouard de Walckiers as ship’s master to take Walckiers’ ship the Concordia from Ostend to India in 1787.

Zimmermann was asked in 1789 to plan a Russian expedition to the Pacific. Although he submitted plans, Russia was then engaged in wars with the Ottoman Empire and with Sweden, and the expedition never eventuated. In 1791–1792 he again took a ship, the Edward, to India for Edouard de Walckiers. The advent of war with revolutionary France put an end to the trade with India from the Austrian Netherlands, and Zimmermann returned to Munich.

He retired to Starnberg in 1804 and died there on 3 May 1805.
