= Johann Georg Edlinger =

Austrian painter (1741–1819)

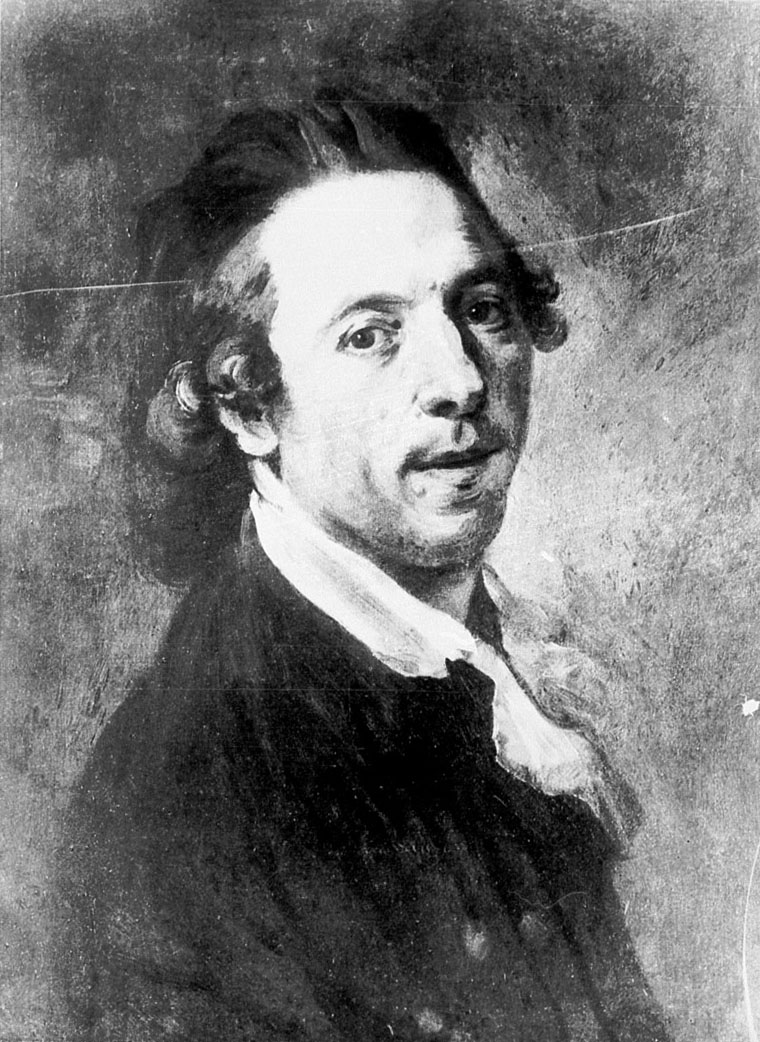
Self portrait, 1786, now in the Städtische Kunstsammlungen, Augsburg

Johann Georg Edlinger (1 March 1741 – 15 September 1819) was an Austrian portrait painter.

Edlinger was born at Graz in 1741. He was a pupil of Desmarées, and became court painter at Munich, where he died in 1819. His portraits are well painted, and show a leaning towards the works of Rembrandt. Some of his portraits of eminent Bavarians, engraved by Friedrich John, appeared in 1821 under the title Sammlung von Bildnissen denkwürdiger Männer.

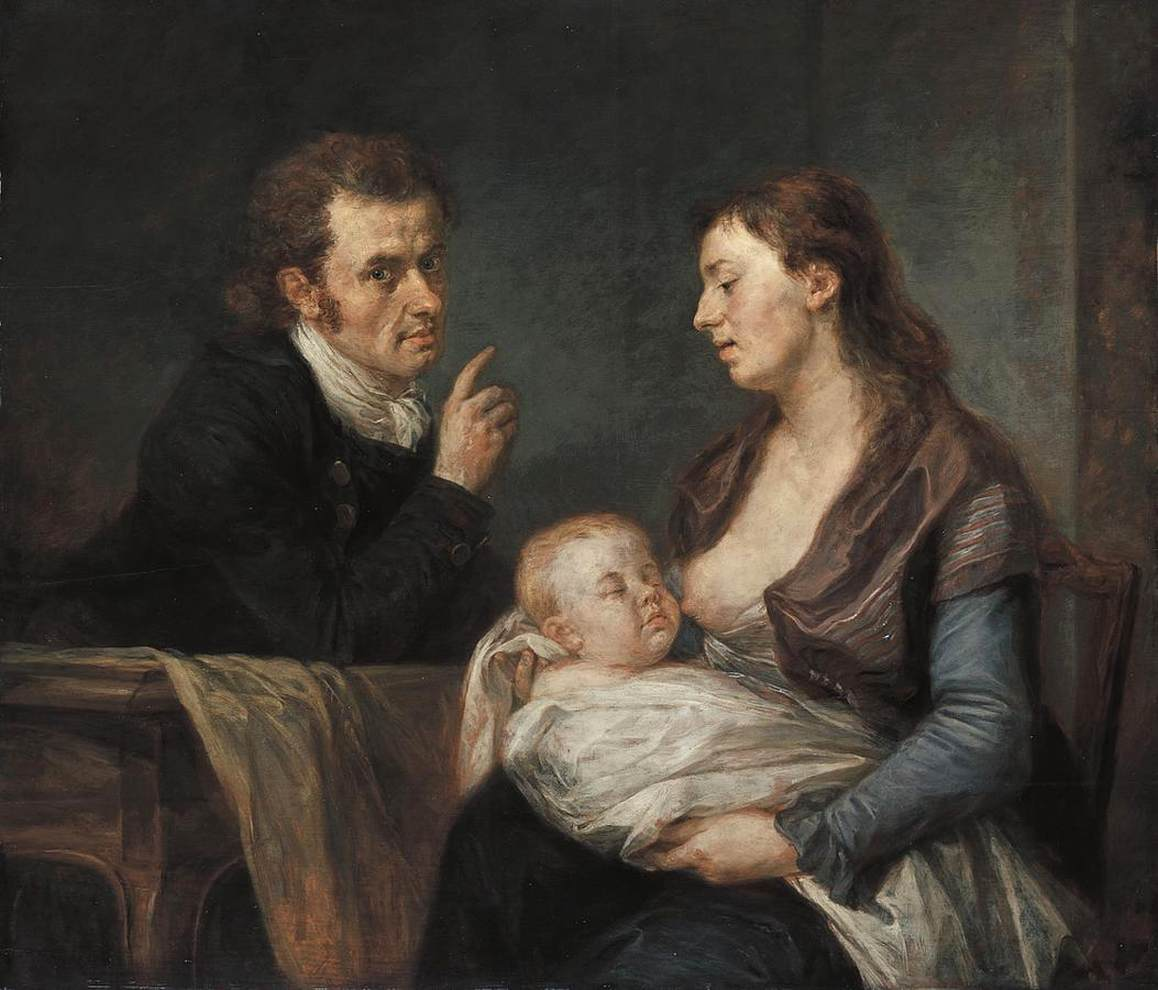
Family portrait, c. 1800, now in the Neue Pinakothek

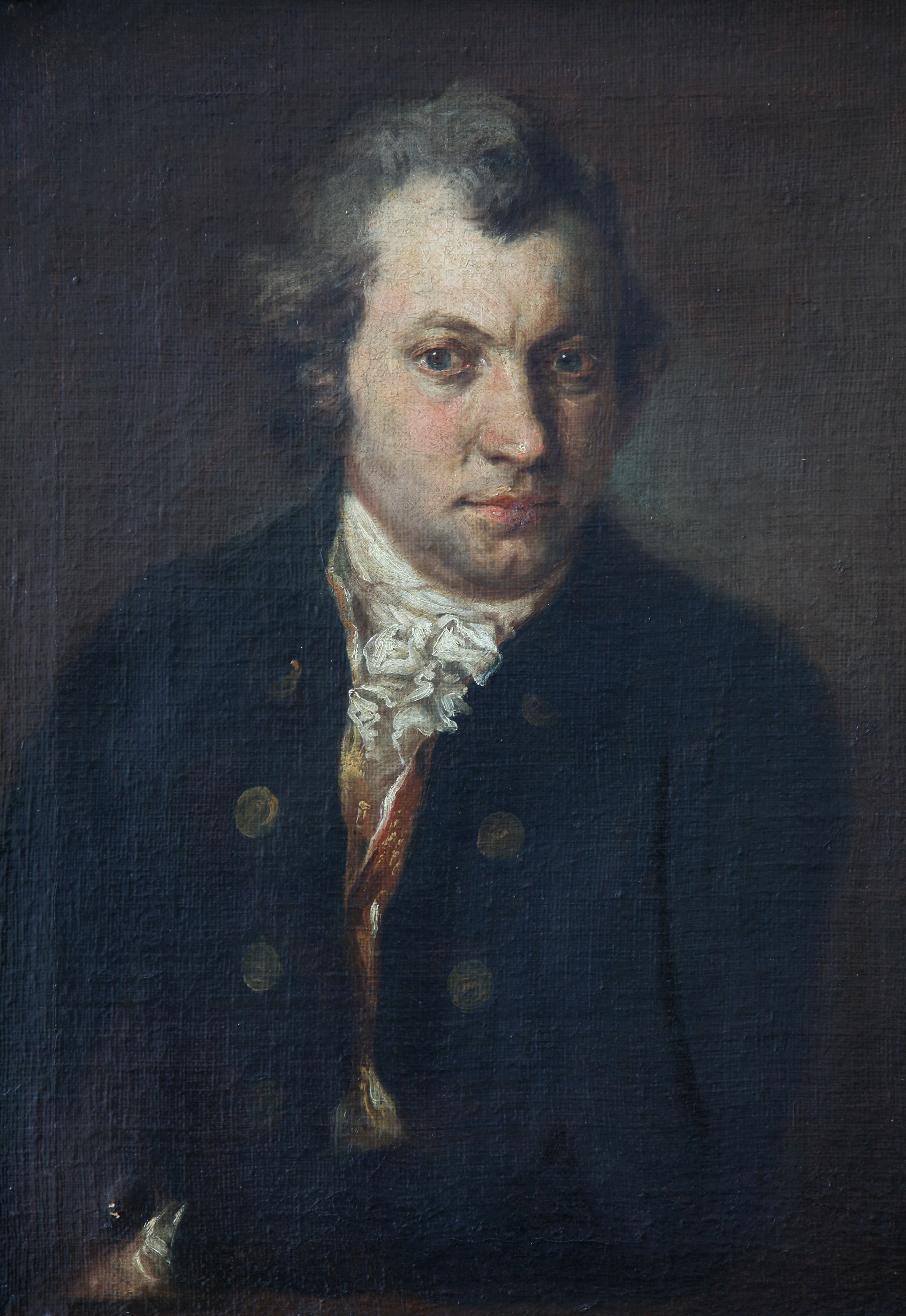
Heinrich Zimmermann, a companion of Captain Cook on his travels around the world
