= Austrian colonization of the Nicobar Islands =

A modern map of the Nicobar (and Andaman) islands.

The Austrian colonization of the Nicobar Islands (German: Nikobaren, renamed to the Theresia Islands [Theresia-Inseln]) involved a series of three separate attempts by the Habsburg monarchy, and later the Austrian Empire, to colonize and settle the Nicobar Islands. Only the first of these launched in 1778, was successful. The second attempt was canceled, and the third, in 1886, was abandoned due to prior colonization by the British in 1868. The Nicobar Islands had been previously colonized by the Danish in 1756; the Danes abandoned the islands after multiple outbreaks of malaria, but continued to lay formal claim to the islands until 1848.

== Previous colonization by the Danish ==
The Nicobar Islands were officially colonized by the Danish on 1 January 1756. Denmark–Norway owned a significant port in India, Tranquebar, and decided to colonize the islands, citing a lack of native resistance, ease of access, and vicinity to Tranquebar. In December 1756, the Danish named the islands Frederick's Islands (Danish: Frederiksøerne), after the then King of Denmark, Frederick V.

Within a few months of colonization, the island of Nancowry was settled, and the colony contracted malaria for the first time. The mosquito-borne tropical disease spread island-to-island until it eventually hit the Danish colonists so hard that the remaining settlers, including the head of the colony, sailed back to Tranquebar in March 1760. Another expedition was made in 1768, but within less than 9 years that colony had disappeared as well.

== Background to Austrian colonization ==
The origins of Austrian colonization of the Nicobar Islands can be traced back to appeals to both Empress Maria Theresa and Emperor Joseph II by William Bolts. Bolts had been previously active in the British East India Company but had been convicted of trading in opium and dismissed. In 1774, he traveled to Vienna to convince the colonially inexperienced Austrians of the feasibility of trade between Trieste and the Far East. Bolts was well received by the Austrian court and was given a ten-year charter allowing him to trade through the Austrian Adriatic ports to Persia, India, China, and Africa.

Bolts, who was then at the court of the Nawab of Mysore, directed the Joseph und Theresia to sail to the Nicobars. In June 1778, the ship docked on the island of Nancowry, and on 12 July, the Nicobarese natives signed a document that ceded all twenty-four islands to Austria. The Austrian flag was then raised on a nearby hill, and 6 men, with slaves, cattle, and arms, were left behind to start the new Austrian colony.

In 1781, the colonists complained about a lack of drinking water and food, but Vienna took no notice and left its outpost to its fate. The colonists managed successfully until Gottfried Stahl, their leader, died in 1783; the remaining colonists decided to abandon the islands in 1785. In addition to Stahl's death, the Danish decided to send a warship from Tranquebar in an attempt to remove the Austrians from Nancowry forcibly.

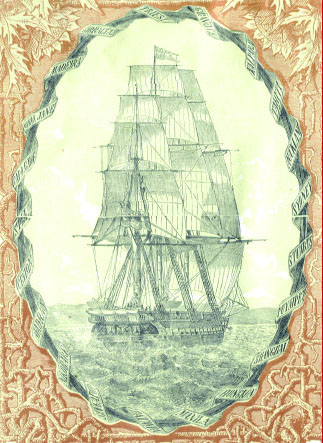
SMS Novara

== Novara expedition of 1858 ==
Motivated by an urge to explore, Archduke Ferdinand Maximilian of Austria in 1857 sent the frigate SMS Novara on a trip of scientific circumnavigation around the globe. On board was a team of researchers from the Austrian Academy of Sciences, which also received the additional task of looking out for possible locations for a penal colony.

In February 1858, Novara reached the island of Car Nicobar, the northernmost island of the chain. The Austrian team sailed around the islands of Nancowry and Kamorta but did not try to occupy them. The leader of the group, ethnologist Karl von Scherzer, encouraged the team to explore the island for artifacts. The researchers acquired more than 400 native artifacts from Nancowry and Kamorta, after which von Scherzer began promoting the idea of recolonization; the Austrian government ruled against it.

If von Scherzer's idea had been accepted by the Austrian government, the colonization would have been most likely uncontested. The Danish had removed all settlements from the Nicobar Islands and relinquished sovereignty over them in 1848, and British colonization lay 10 years in the future.

== Aurora expedition ==
In 1886, the Austro-Hungarian corvette SMS Aurora anchored in the harbor of Nancowry before continuing her voyage to the Far East. The Austrians then realized that the British had already settled the islands. In 1868, the British had officially purchased the rights to all twenty-four of the Nicobar Islands from the Danish government. There were no further plans for Austrian recolonization.

== See also ==
- Danish India
- Danish East India Company
- Austrian colonial policy
- Former Austrian colonies
- Habsburg monarchy
