= Austrian colonial policy =

Colonial attempts by Austria

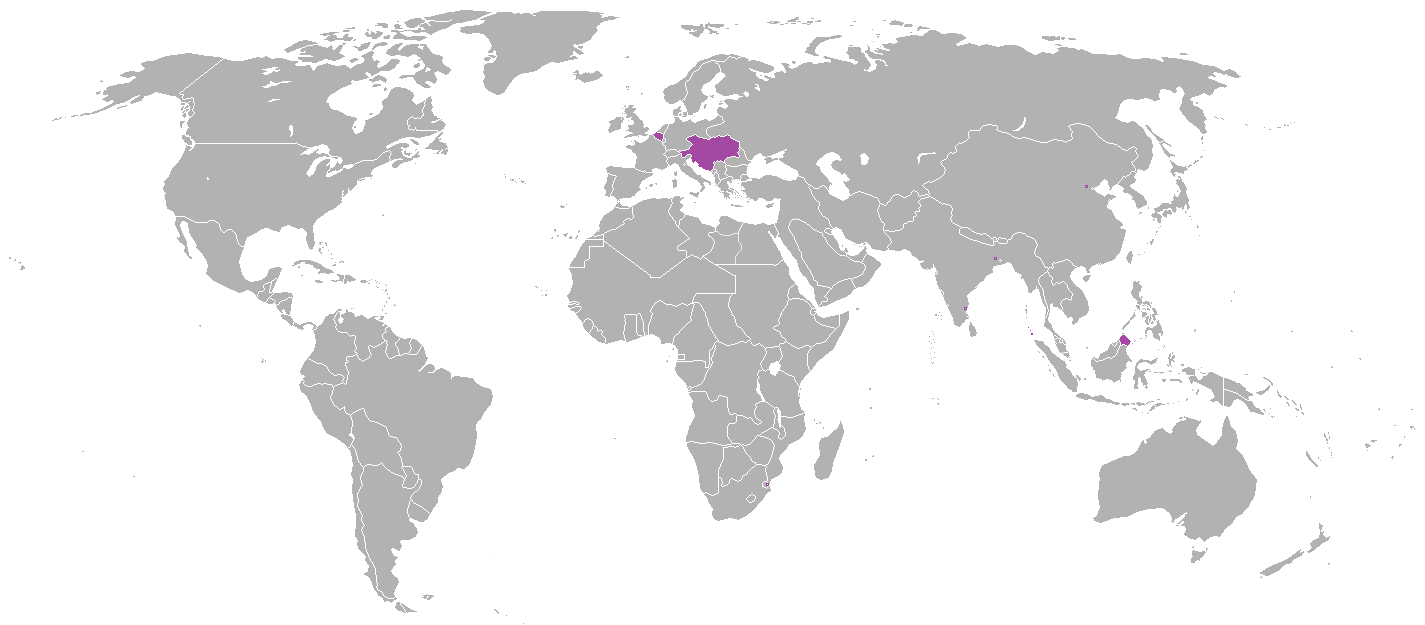
A map showing the places that have been Austrian or Austro-Hungarian colonies and concessions, at different times.

Austrian colonial policy consisted of a small number of limited and generally short-lived efforts by the Habsburg monarchy, the Austrian Empire, and later Austria-Hungary to establish overseas commercial and colonial footholds. From the 17th century through the 19th century, Austrian merchants and governments sponsored several ventures aimed at expanding trade, including trading companies and acquiring factories, but none developed into a substantial overseas empire.

Compared with other European great powers, Austria and later Austria-Hungary pursued a limited colonial policy. Habsburg priorities were primarily continental. Consequently, overseas ventures such as the Ostend Company, the settlements at Delagoa Bay and the Nicobar Islands, and the Austro-Hungarian concession of Tianjin remained both short-lived and small in scale.

The colonial domains of the dual monarchy Austria-Hungary, from 1867 to 1918, are covered in Austro-Hungarian rule in Bosnia and Herzegovina. Keeping Bosnia and Herzegovina under control was a major factor in the Austro-Hungarian entry into World War I, although the territory was administered as part of the monarchy rather than as an overseas colony.

== Ostend East India Company ==
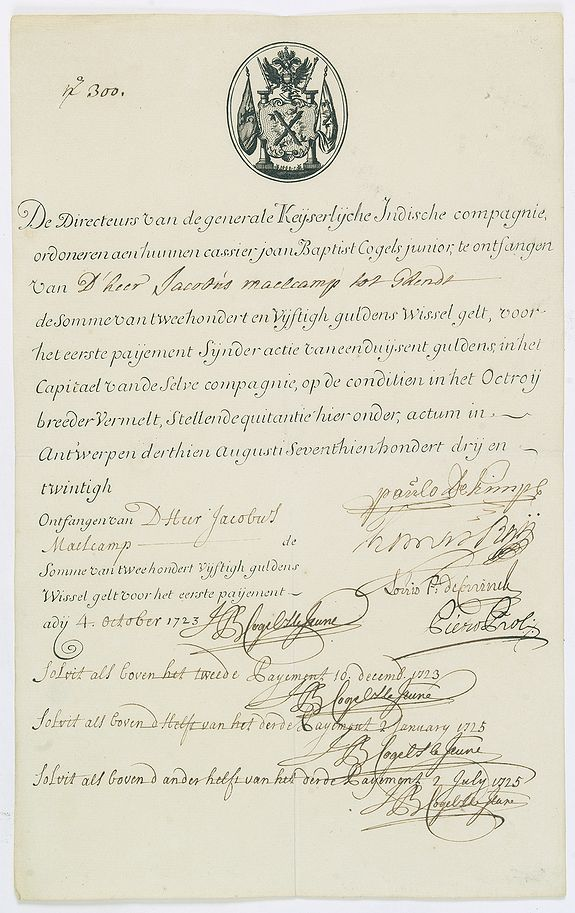
Share No. 4527 of the Ostend East India Company

The Ostend East India Company was a private merchant company formed in 1715, based in the Austrian Netherlands (modern-day Belgium). Charles VI provided the company with 6 million guilders, as a public-private monopoly with 6,000 shares set at 1,000 guilders each. Due to the speed of the Ostender's trade ships, the company, within a couple of years became one of the largest trading firms in the East and Canton. By 1720, the Ostend Company had been transporting 7 million pounds of tea, which was about 41.78% of the tea traded from the Port of Canton.

The private Ostend Company consisted of two Flemish brothers-in-law, Paulo Cloots and Jacomo de Pret, who formed a consortium with two Dutch merchant houses of De Bruyn and Geelhand; Cloots and de Pret also invited the two London houses of Hambly and Trehee, and the French baker Antoine Crozat to invest in the company. After seven years of profitable ventures, and much fighting between other merchants in Antwerp and Ghent, Charles VI agreed to its petition of official charter.

In 1715, the Ostend Company acquired trading charters in the ports of Mocha, Surat, and Canton. In 1723, the Ostender's obtained trading ports in the lucrative harbors of Banquibazar and Cabelon. The trade missions to Mocha were initially successful, but due to the wreck of the Mochaman, a trade vessel headed to the Red Sea in 1720, and the capture of a home-bound vessel by the Barbary Pirates in 1723, Mocha eventually turned into a heavy loss. The ports of Surat and Canton however, continued to be quite profitable. All the profits went to the Southern Netherlands and none to Austria.

The company had become such a threat to British, Dutch, Portuguese, and French interests, that when Emperor Charles VI promulgated the edict of the Pragmatic Sanction of 1713, it was refused international recognition on the grounds of Ostend Company's success in the East Indies. These International political pressures ended its extraordinary growth, and in 1727 the charter was suspended, leading to the company being dissolved by 1732.

After the Imperial government's withdrawal of the Ostend Company's charter, the Great Powers accepted the Pragmatic Sanction. The suspension also allowed the Austrians to sign the Treaty of Vienna (1731) with the British; which allied both powers in the Anglo-Austrian Alliance.

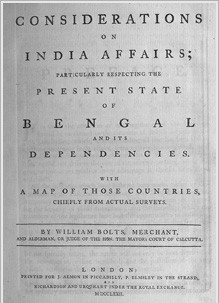
Bolts' book entitled Considerations on India(n) Affairs: Particularly Respecting the Present State of Bengal and it's Dependencies..."

== Maputo Bay ==
Maputo Bay, formerly also known as Delagoa Bay from Baía da Lagoa in Portuguese, is an inlet of the Indian Ocean on the coast of Mozambique. In 1776, an expelled British trade official, Colonel William Bolts, approached the Austrian Imperial Court with a request to found a trading company to explore possible routes in Africa, India, and China. Empress Maria Theresa was intrigued and decided to form the Austrian Asiatic Company of Trieste, with Bolts as the head of the company. Colonel Bolts had previously been under the service of the British East India Company and was already competent in trade and colonization efforts. Bolts had also heard that the area was a possible site for gold mining.

Sailing from Flanders in 1778, Bolts and his company of Austrian-Italian subjects, the Austrian ship Joseph und Theresia of the Austrian East India Company docked in Delagoa Bay in 1779. Bolts then made treaties with the local Mabudu chieftains, who inhabited the port. Austrians erect the St. Joseph and St. Maria forts, A trading post (factory) was built, and the factory quickly began to thrive under Austrian rule, also due to their participation in the slave trade. Bolts shortly after, set sail to promote Austrian interests in India. After two years, the factory, which was composed of 155 men and a number of women, traded in ivory, and profits reached as high as 75,000 pounds per year. The factory was expelled by the Portuguese in 1781.

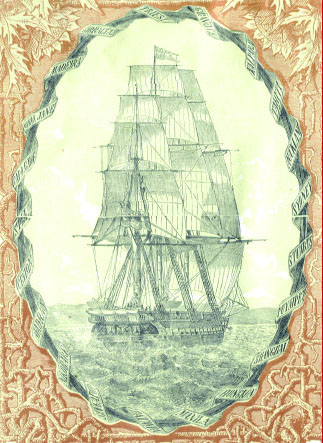
SMS Novara on the Novara Expedition of 1857-1859.

The Austrian presence in Delagoa Bay caused the ivory price to change dramatically. This was due to the Austrian output, which exceeded that of the Portuguese in Mozambique Island. Unfortunately for the Austrians, the port contracted malaria in 1781, and the Portuguese successfully asserted their dominance of the area; the Portuguese then proceeded to expel the remainder of Austrian colonists.

== Multiple attempts in the Nicobar Islands ==
=== First attempt ===
After William Bolts' mission in Delagoa Bay, he directed a venture to the Nicobar Islands. This mission was a part of his colonial ventures in India; and in 1778, Gottfried Stahl and his crew arrived on the ship Joseph und Theresia. Stahl greeted the natives personally and made a contract with the Nicobarese, where all twenty-four islands were to be signed over to the Austrians. The colonization effort was successful until Stahl, whom Bolts had appointed as head of the colony, died in 1783. The colonists lost courage in their settlement attempts, and the islands were abandoned in 1785.

=== Second attempt and expedition ===
Seventy-three years later in 1858, the SMS Novara, then on its circumnavigation of the globe, decided to sail to Nicobar. SMS Novara landed in Car Nicobar, the northernmost island, and its purpose was to promote scientific exploration and included the search for possible penal colonies. The leader of the group, Karl von Scherzer, promoted re-colonization. Austrian scientists and archaeologists then explored the islands of Nancowry and Kamorta and collected over 400 artifacts native to the islands. The Austrian government decided against Von Scherzer's recommendations, and closed all potential colonial opportunities.

=== Third attempt ===
In 1886, the Austrians became interested in another possible colonization attempt. When the crew arrived on the island of Nancowry with the corvette SMS Aurora, they were surprised to find the entire Nicobar Island chain had been colonized by the British several years earlier. In 1868, the British purchased the claims to the Nicobar Islands from the Danish and established it as a penal colony for several years. This ended all further possibilities to colonize the area.

== Exploration of Franz-Joseph's Land ==
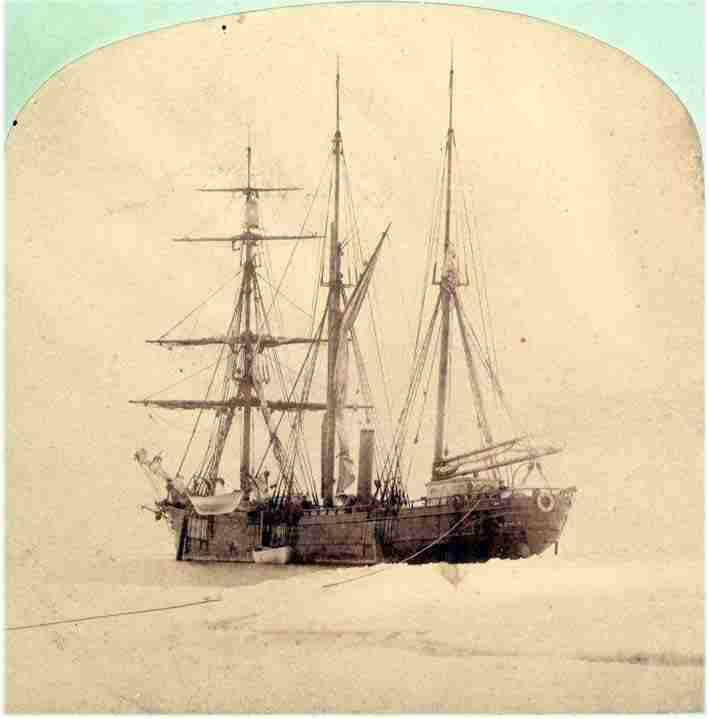
A photograph of the Tegetthoff trapped in the ice.

In 1873, an Austrian expedition, according to its leader Julius von Payer, was sent to the North Pole tasked with finding the Northeast Passage. The expedition actually ended up close to the Novaya Zemlya archipelago, the easternmost point of Europe. Karl Weyprecht, the expedition's secondary leader, claimed the second intended destination after the Northeast Passage was the North Pole.

The cost of the journey is estimated to be around 175,000 florins. The project was promoted and financially supported by several Austrian and Hungarian noblemen, which included Count Johann Nepomuk Wilczek and Count Ödön Zichy. The head-ship was named after the Admiral Wilhelm von Tegetthoff. The Tegetthoff weighed 220 tonnes, 125.78 feet long (38.34 m.), and had a 100 horsepower (75 kW) steam engine).

The Tegetthoff left port at Tromsø, Norway in July 1872. Soon after arriving in the Arctic Circle, the Tegetthoff became locked in pack ice and drifted for the remainder of their journey. While drifting within the ice, the explorers discovered an archipelago and decided to name it after the then-current Emperor Franz Joseph. The crew later was able to dock and performed several sled expeditions on the island chain.

Two years later in May 1874, Captain Weyprecht decided to abandon the ice-locked Tegetthoff and believed the crew could return to the mainland by sleds and boats. On 14 August, the expedition reached the open sea. The expedition then arrived at Novaya Zemlya, where a Russian fishing vessel rescued them. The crew was dropped off in Vardø, Norway; and were able to arrive in Austria-Hungary by train from Hamburg.

== Berlin Conference of 1884–1885 ==
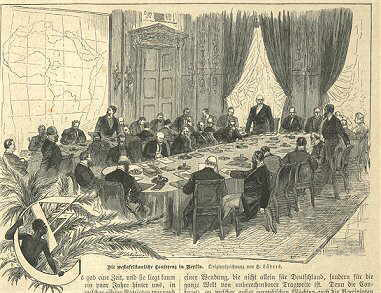
The Berlin Conference in 1884

The Berlin Conference was held to settle matters of African colonization, particularly regarding the Congo territory and West Africa. Austria-Hungary was only invited to the Conference due to its status as a great power. While Austria did not petition for any permanent colonies or treaty ports, it did acquire some indirect benefits. Imre Széchényi, serving as one of the head members of the Conference, was able to procure the privilege of free docking rights in all European-controlled ports in Africa except for those in the British Cape Colony, Italian Somaliland and French Madagascar.

== North Borneo ==
In 1877, a Hong Kong-based merchant sold his rights to North Borneo to the consul of the Austro-Hungarian Empire based in that city, Baron Gustav von Overbeck. In 1878 Gustav von Overbeck bought land from the sultanates of Brunei and Sulu; and acquired additional land from the American Borneo Trading Company, to form what was then known as the North Borneo protectorate. A friend of Overbeck's, William Clarke Cowie, had influence with the Sulu Sultanate, allowing him the January 22, 1878 purchase yet more land to add to North Borneo protectorate.

Following these purchases, Overbeck traveled to Europe, where he then attempted to sell off the newly created North Borneo by promoting it as a penal colony. He reached out to the Austro-Hungarian Empire, the United Kingdom, the German Empire, and Kingdom of Italy. Due to a general lack of interest, Overbeck later sold these lands to Alfred Dent, a British colonial merchant who later formed the British North Borneo Company in 1880. A year later, the United Kingdom revived interest in the territory and then purchased North Borneo from Dent in 1881.

North Borneo could technically be considered an Austrian colony for one reason. Baron von Overbeck, though German, was the Austro-Hungarian consul in Hong Kong, so control of Borneo under an Austrian citizen would define it as a possession of Austria-Hungary.

== Rio de Oro ==
After the humiliation in the Spanish–American War, Spain wished to divest itself of its colonies, and in 1898, Spanish diplomats approached the Austro-Hungarian Colonial Society about a possible purchase of the trading port of Río de Oro. The society's vice-president, Ernst von Weisl, made a quiet deal with Agenor Maria Gołuchowski, the Minister of Foreign Affairs for Austria. Goluchowski later convinced the Austrian Imperial Council, and Emperor Franz Joseph I openly supported the deal. However, the success of the business, which promised significant profits, was hindered by the Monarchy’s unwillingness to invest public funds.

The process faced significant setbacks, primarily due to internal disagreements among economic groups and the government. The government initially wanted to negotiate directly with the Spanish, but there was a lack of consensus on who should lead the talks. Proposals included using the Austrian-Hungarian Colonial Society or prominent figures like Austrian Commerce Minister Baron Josef De Paoli or businessman Arthur Krupp, but these were met with obstacles. De Paoli sought the involvement of Foreign Minister Agenor Goluchowski, while Krupp rejected the offer due to past failures in Somalia.

By the end of 1899, the negotiations stalled, with neither the government nor business circles willing to invest the necessary funds. The Spanish continued waiting for an offer from Austria-Hungary, despite interest from other countries, including Germany, Britain, France, and Italy, in the territory. Ultimately, the Spanish began talks with the French, who sought to acquire Rio de Oro to expand their colonial holdings in North Africa. However, public opinion in Spain shifted, and the government eventually decided against selling the territory.

== Port of Tianjin ==
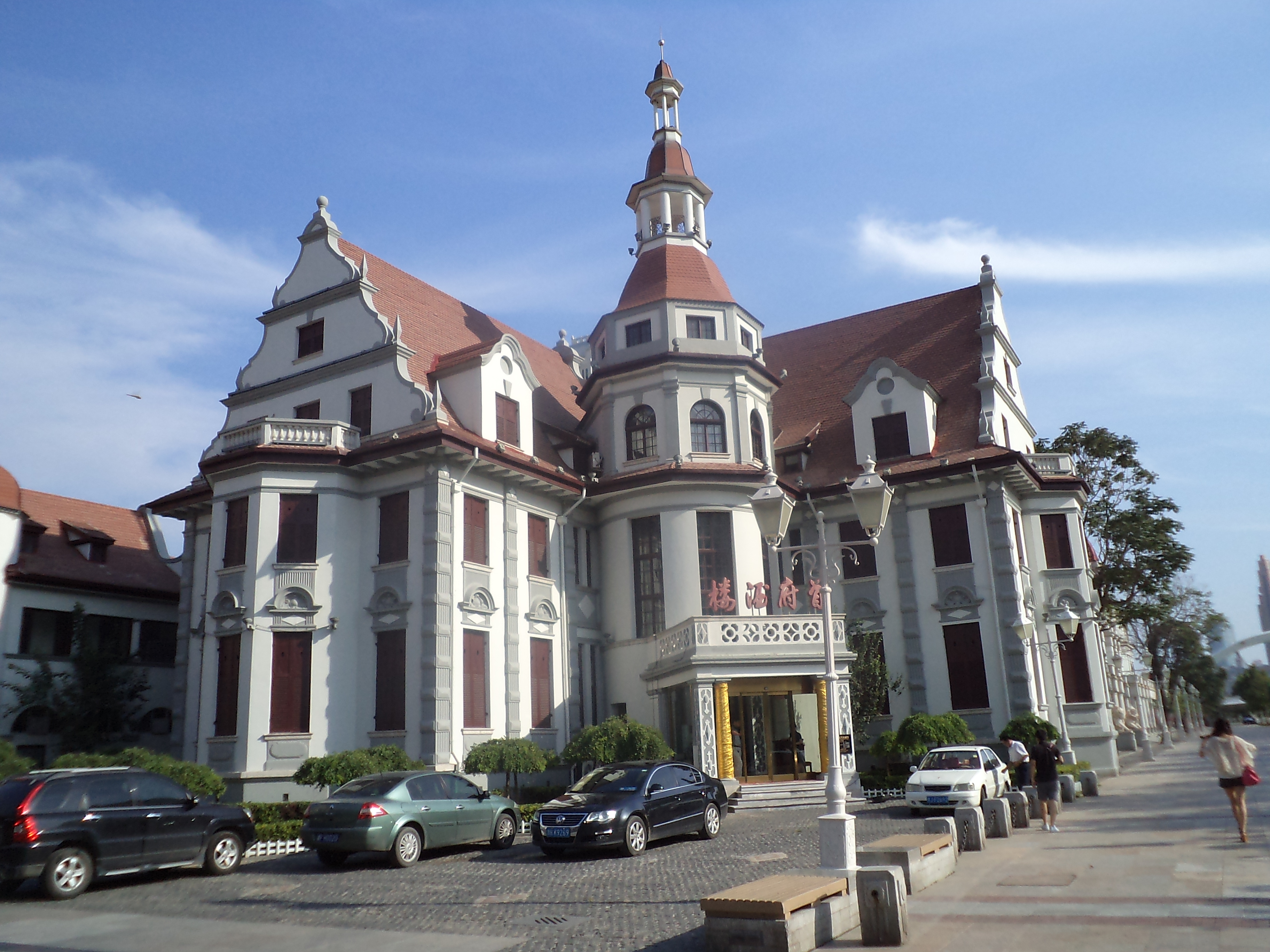
Yuan Shikai's Mansion in the Austro-Hungarian concession was built in 1918, although Yuan never lived here.

Austria-Hungary participated in the Eight-Nation Alliance from 1899 to 1901. This grand alliance was formed to contain the Boxer Rebellion in China. The Austro-Hungarian Navy helped in suppressing the rising. However, Austria-Hungary sent the smallest force of any nation. Only four cruisers and a force of only 296 marines were dispatched.

Even so, on 27 December 1902, Austria gained a concession zone in Tianjin as part of the reward for its contribution to the Alliance. The Austrian concession zone was 150 acres (0.61 km^{2}) in area; which was slightly larger than the Italian, but smaller than the Belgian zone. The self-contained concession had its own prison, school, barracks, and hospital. It also contained the Austro-Hungarian consulate and its citizens were under Austrian, not Chinese, rule.

The concession was provided with a small garrison, and Austria-Hungary proved unable to maintain control of its concession during the Great War. The concession zone was swiftly occupied on the Chinese declaration of war on the Central Powers. On 14 August 1917 the lease was terminated, along with that of the larger German concession in the same city.

After the war, the First Austrian Republic abandoned all claims to Tianjin on 10 September 1919. The Kingdom of Hungary also made a similar recognition in 1920. However, despite its relatively short life-span of 15 years, the Austrians left their mark on that area of the city, as can be seen in the Austrian architecture that still stands in the city.

=== List of consuls ===
- Carl Bernauer: 1901–1908
- Erwin Ritter von Zach: 1908
- Miloš Kobr: 1908–1912
- Hugo Schumpeter: 1913–1917

== See also ==
- German colonial empire
- German colonial projects before 1871
- List of former German colonies
