= William Bolts =

British merchant and author active in India (1738–1808)

William Bolts (7 February 1739 – 1808) was a Dutch-born British merchant active in India. He began his career as an employee of the East India Company, and subsequently became an independent merchant. He is best known today for his 1772 book, Considerations on India Affairs, which detailed the administration of the East India Company in Bengal which began shortly after their victory in the Battle of Plassey in June 1757. The observations and experiences he recorded offer a unique resource for scholars inquiring into the nature of Company rule in Bengal. Throughout his life, Bolts continued to propose and execute various trading ventures on his own behalf and in conjunction with various commercial and governmental partners. The ventures of individual traders, like Bolts, did much to spur governments and large corporations into the expansion of their own interests.

== Origin ==
William Bolts was born in Amsterdam on 7 February 1739. The baptismal register of the English Reformed Church at Amsterdam records his baptism on 21 February 1739. His parents were William and Sarah Bolts. Bolts himself declared that his father was a native of Heidelberg and therefore claimed to be "a subject of Germany", although at the time of this statement he was attempting to get out of legal problems with the Company. Some sources suggest that Bolts himself was born in Germany. Many writers have claimed that Bolts was of ethnic Dutch origin, although writer Willem G.J. Kuiters notes that this claim appears to originate with a single source, the Biographie universelle from 1812, and is not confirmed by Dutch archival sources.

== Service in the East India Company ==
When Bolts was 15, he left for England. According to a deposition he made in 1801, Bolts lived in Portugal in 1755 where he spent some time working in the diamond trade. Four years later, Bolts decided to venture to Bengal, where he was employed in Calcutta as a factor in the service of the East India Company. He learned to speak Bengali, in addition to his other languages, English, Dutch, German, Portuguese and French. (Note: However, Willem Kuiters notes that Bolts listed neither Dutch nor German among the languages he knew in a letter to the King of Sweden. He also made use of an interpreter when engaging in negotiations in Vienna.) Later, he was appointed to the Company's Benares (Varanasi) factory, where he opened a woolens mart, developed saltpeter manufacturing, established opium plantations, imported cotton, and promoted the trade in diamonds from the Panna and Chudderpoor (Chhatarpur) mines in Bundelkhand.

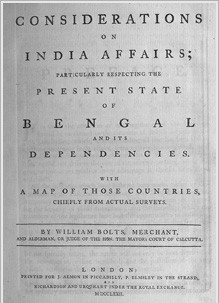
Bolts' book revealing the EIC's business practices in Bengal.

He came into conflict with the East India Company in 1768, possibly because diamonds were a favorite means for Company employees to secretly remit back home profits made by private trade in India, which they were officially forbidden to engage in. He announced in September of that year that he intended to start up a newspaper in Calcutta (which would have been India's first modern newspaper), saying that he had "in manuscript many things to communicate which most intimately concerned every individual", but he was directed to quit Bengal, and proceed to Madras and from thence to take his passage to England. Company officials declared him bankrupt, "to the irretrievable loss of his Fortune", he later claimed. He never seemed to have been able to redeem himself in the eyes of the Company, and in London and elsewhere fought a rearguard action against his many opponents within it.

=== Considerations on India Affairs ===
The rearguard action occurred in 1772 with the publication of his book Considerations on India Affairs, in which he attacked the administration of the East India Company in Bengal; and in particular complained of the arbitrary power exercised by the authorities and of his own deportation. Considerations was translated into French and enjoyed wide circulation, which contributed to his fame on the Continent. The observations and experiences he records still offer a unique resource for scholars inquiring into the nature of Company rule in Bengal.

== The voyage of the Giuseppe e Teresa, 1776–1781 ==
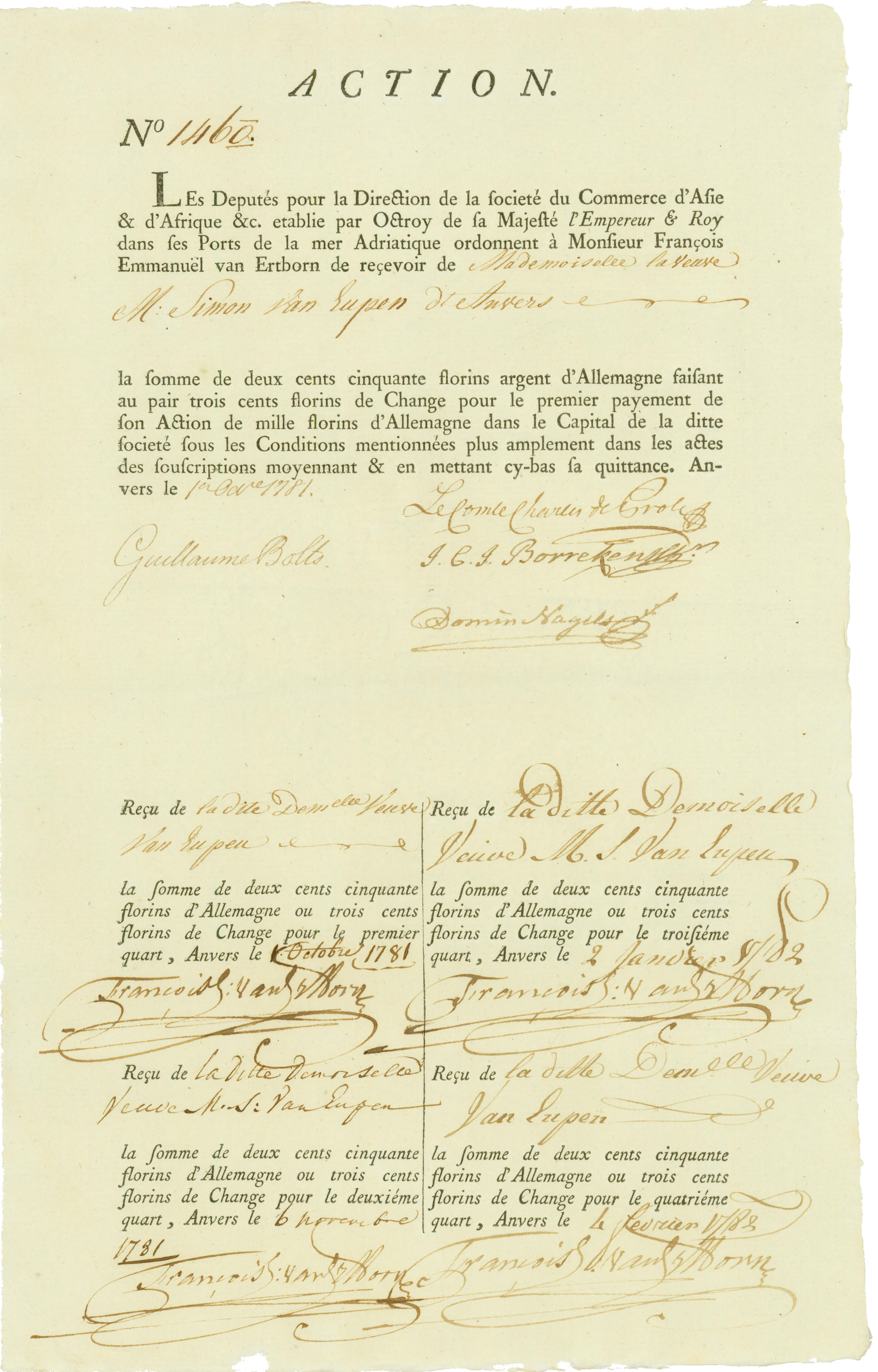
Share of the Soc. du Commerce d'Asie & d'Afrique & C., issued 1. October 1871, signed by Bolts, Proli, Borrikens and Nagel

In 1775, Bolts offered his services to the government of the Holy Roman Empire, putting forward a proposal for re-establishing Austrian trade with India from the Adriatic port of Trieste. His proposal was accepted by the government of Empress Maria Theresa, and on 24 September 1776, Bolts sailed from Leghorn (today's Livorno) in the dominions of Leopold, Grand Duke of Tuscany, the younger son of the Empress, to India in command of a ship under the Imperial flag, the former Indiaman Earl of Lincoln, renamed the Giuseppe e Teresa (also called Joseph et Thérèse or Joseph und Therese). He took with him a ten-year charter authorizing him to trade under Imperial colors between Austria's Adriatic ports and Persia, India, China and Africa, and from Africa and Madagascar to America. This enterprise required substantial capital, which Bolts sought in the Austrian Netherlands (Belgium), and he brought in the Antwerp banker, Charles Proli, and his associates, the bankers I.C.I. Borrikens and D. Nagel.

=== Colonisation of Delagoa Bay ===
In the next few years Bolts established factories on the Malabar Coast, on the South East African coast at Delagoa Bay and at the Nicobar Islands. His aim in establishing a factory at Delagoa Bay was to use it as a base for trade between East Africa and the West coast ports of India. He procured three ships to conduct this "country" trade, as trade by Europeans between India and other non-European destinations was called. During his voyage out, he obtained Brazilian cochineal beetles at Rio de Janeiro, and transported them to Delagoa Bay, thereby predating the introduction to Bengal of this insect for the making of scarlet dyes and carmine. The Imperial flag did not fly for long over Delagoa Bay, as alarmed Portuguese authorities who claimed the place as their own sent a 40-gun frigate and 500 men from Goa to remove Bolts's men in April 1781, and to found the Presidio of Lourenço Marques (Maputo) that established a permanent Portuguese presence there.

=== Activities in India, 1776–1781 ===
When it learned of Bolts's venture, the East India Company instructed its officers in Bengal, Madras and Bombay to "pursue the most effectual means that can be fully justified to counteract and defeat" him. Bolts took full advantage of Austria's neutral status in the war between Britain and France, Spain and the Dutch Republic during 1778 to 1783 that formed part of the war for American independence. The Company's hostility towards Bolts in India were the subject of urgent representations by the Austrian Ambassador in London, resulting in the sending in January 1782 of instructions from the Court of Directors to India, which ordered their officers in India not to give offence to "any subject of his Imperial Majesty". Although when he first arrived in India, at Surat, the East India Company made every effort to frustrate his activities, he soon made himself known to Hyder Ali, the Nawab of Mysore. He visited Hyder Ali at his capital, Seringapatam, where he was granted permission to establish trading factories in the Nawab's Malabar Coast dominions at Mangalore, Karwar and Baliapatam.

=== Colonisation of the Nicobar Islands ===
While Bolts himself was at Seringapatam, he sent the Joseph und Theresia to the Nicobar Islands, where she arrived in June 1778. There her captain, Bennet, took possession on 12 July. The islands were the focus of a Christian missionary effort of the Moravian Brethren, who visited from time to time from the Danish base on the Indian mainland at Tranquebar. In consequence of Bolts' action, the Imperial company had established a trading factory on the island of Nancowery, headed by Gottfried Stahl who was accompanied by five other Europeans. Danish authorities strongly protested against Bolts' action in taking possession of the Nicobars, and in 1783 sent a warship to remove the Austrians.

=== Bolts in dispute with Proli ===
In spite of his many achievements since 1776, Bolts's venture, on the whole, had made a loss, to the dismay of his Belgian financial backers, Charles Proli and his associates. Proli also disagreed with Bolts over the importance of the China market: Proli wanted to concentrate exclusively on that market while Bolts urged the equal importance of India as Austrian commodities, such as mercury, lead, copper, iron, tin, and vitriol, could find sale there, in contrast to China where only Spanish silver dollars were accepted in return for Chinese products such as tea, porcelain, and silk.

While Bolts was still in India, the Proli group sent out two ships, the Ville de Vienne to Mauritius and the Prince Kaunitz to China, without informing him. In ignorance of Bolts' purchase of a ship he called the Prince Kaunitz, the Proli group sent another ship of the same name to China independently of him. This constituted a breach of their contract with him. They refused to honor the bills he drew upon their bank while he was in India. Proli petitioned the Imperial Government to have Bolts' charter transferred exclusively to him. Proli also seized the Joseph et Therese as security when the vessel returned to Leghorn.

At an audience with Emperor Joseph II in Brussels on 28 July 1781, Bolts and Proli agreed to the transformation of their association into a share company, and in August, Bolts surrendered his charters to the new Imperial Company of Trieste and Antwerp for the Commerce of Asia (Société Impériale pour le Commerce Asiatique de Trieste et d'Anvers). The Company was to send six ships to China and India, two to East Africa and Mauritius, and three for the southern whale fishery.

== Imperial Company of Trieste and Antwerp ==
The Imperial Company of Trieste and Antwerp was opened to public subscription in August 1781 to raise, nominally, half its capital in one thousand shares. In fact, the Company was seriously under-capitalized, as the other thousand shares held by the Proli group and Bolts were paid for by the nominal value of the assets of the former association. Bolts' valuation of those assets was accepted at face value, but it was a fictitious valuation and in fact the new Company inherited the old association's debts. It consequently suffered chronic lack of cash and had to resort to short-term loans and bottomry bonds (for which the ships themselves were the collateral) at a premium of 30 to 35 per cent. Under these conditions, every voyage had to be a success for the Company to remain viable. Also under the terms of the agreement erecting the new company, Bolts ceded his charter to his Belgian partners in return for a loan of 200,000 florins (that is, his 200 shares in the Company) and the right to send two ships on his own account to China. The "new India Company, under the direction of Mr. Boltz", known as the Triestine Society, was announced by the press in Trieste on 17 August 1782, with a reference to the two vessels it would possess.

The Imperial Asiatic Company, under the direction of the Proli group, focussed on the China tea trade. In 1781, 1782 and 1783 the price of tea in Europe, especially in England, had risen to unheard of levels. In 1781 and 1782 no Dutch or French ships appeared at Canton as a result of the American War, and in 1782 only eleven English, three Danish and two Swedish ships called there. Only four out of thirteen British ships returned safely in 1783 due to French depredations. Attempting to seize the opportunity to make good profits, the Proli group sent five ships to Canton: the Croate, the Kollowrath, the Zinzendorff, the Archiduc Maximilien, and the Autrichien.

However, the opportunity had been missed as, with the signing of an armistice in January 1783 the former belligerents were able to send their ships to Canton safely, and the summer of 1783 saw a total of thirty-eight ships there, including the five Imperial vessels. They had to buy tea at a high price, but when they returned to Ostend in July 1784 they had to sell at a low price on a glutted market, as well as having to pay for permission to return to that port. The price of tea at Ostend collapsed when the British Government introduced the Commutation Act in 1784, which reduced the tax on tea from fifty to ten per cent and made smuggling from the Netherlands unprofitable.

The price of tea in Europe fell suddenly from 30 to 33 French sols to 11 to 14 sols, or around sixty per cent. Disastrously, a sixth ship, the Belgioioso, carrying a large amount of silver specie for the purchase of Chinese goods, foundered in a storm in the Irish Sea soon after departing Liverpool, where she was fitted out, on the voyage to Canton. Regardless of mounting losses, debts and liabilities, the Company invested in a further ship, the Kaiserliche Adler or Aigle Impériale [Imperial Eagle], a giant of 1,100 tons, specially built for the Company by the Fiume shipyards, which was launched in March 1784, bringing the Company's fleet to a total of nine vessels.

Matters came to a head in January 1785 when the Company suspended all payments, and shortly afterward it was declared bankrupt, bringing the Proli banking house down with it. Charles Proli committed suicide. An article in the Dublin press of 25 May 1786 recorded the sale of the dissolved company's ships, Zinderdorf [sic], Kollowrath, Kaunitz, Maximilian and Austrian, "together with their whole apparel, guns, stores, &c." and observed: "The destruction of this company, as well as several others in Europe, is in a great measure owing to the commutation tea tax in England, and the advantages which territorial possessions throw in favour of the British company."

In February 1785, in the unfolding bankruptcy of the Imperial Asiatic Company, the Aigle Impériale was seized by creditors at Cadiz, where she had gone to load Spanish dollars to pay for tea and other goods in China. Eventually she was chartered by the Royal Company of the Philippines for a voyage to explore the best direct route to the Philippines from Spain, as opposed to the traditional Acapulco-Manila galleon route. Under the name Aguila Imperial she sailed for the Philippines under the command of Francisco Muñoz y San Clemente, departing Cadiz on 23 January 1786, calling at the Cape of Good Hope and Java, and arriving at Manila on 9 August of that year. She sailed on the return voyage to Spain from Manila on 11 January 1787, called at Mauritius, and arrived at Cadiz on 17 March 1788. Her voyage was complemented by that of the Astrea, which left Cadiz in June 1786 under the command of Alejandro Malaspina, going out to the Philippines for the Company by the Cape Horn route and returning to Spain by the Cape of Good Hope, arriving at Cadiz on 17 May 1788.

== Plan for a voyage to the North West Coast of America ==
After Bolts returned from India in May 1781, he developed the idea for a voyage to the North West Coast of America to engage in the trade in sea otter furs to China and Japan. He apparently heard from John Reid, his agent at Canton (Guangzhou), of the success the crew of James Cook's ships had had there in November 1779 in selling the sea otter pelts they had obtained for trinkets on the American coast in the course of Cook's third expedition to the Pacific. Bolts' ship, the Kaunitz (not to be confused with the Proli group's vessel of the same name), arrived back at Leghorn (Livorno) from Canton with this news on 8 July 1781. Bolts afterward wrote that he had the ambition of wishing to be the first to profit from this new branch of trade.

At an audience in Vienna in May 1782, Bolts discussed his plan with Emperor Joseph II, for which he had bought a ship in England in November 1781. The ship was called the Cobenzell (or Cobenzl) in honor of the Vice-Chancellor of State, Count Philipp Cobenzl (Kobenzl), a patron of the Imperial Company. Bolts' plan called for the ship to round Cape Horn, take on furs at Nootka, sell or trade them in China and Japan, and return by the Cape of Good Hope. He engaged four sailors who had served under Cook, including George Dixon, who subsequently commanded the Queen Charlotte on a voyage to the North West coast for the Etches Company of London, and Heinrich Zimmermann, who had written an account in German of Cook's final voyage. He bought a sloop, the Trieste, as a tender, and obtained letters of credence from the Emperor to various rulers at whose ports the ship would touch.

=== Proposed scientific voyage of discovery ===
The Emperor lent a ready ear to Bolts as the venture offered a vehicle for carrying into effect his desire, prompted by the voyages of James Cook, for an Austrian round the world voyage dedicated to scientific research. This had been urged by the eminent savant Ignaz von Born who, at the Emperor's invitation, nominated five naturalists to go with Bolts on the Cobenzell. The intended expedition was reported in the English press in mid-October 1782, in the following terms:

The Emperor intends to signalise himself, in imitation of other Princes, by sending a ship round the world to make discoveries. The vessel destined for this tedious and dangerous expedition, is the Count de Cobenzet [sic], which cleared out of the Port of London the 15th of April last; sailed from Leghorn the 26th of August, and arrived at Trieste the 1st of September with a great cargo, part of which she is to take out with her, particularly fourteen chests of watches and watch-work, which she brought from London. Four persons of great learning are to be sent out in her, at the Emperor's expence, to make discoveries in Natural Philosophy.

Although the Emperor was initially enthusiastic, he refused to provide finance for it apart from the expenses of his naturalists, and the venture eventually proved impossible to realize. Bolts' hopes for a commercial voyage and the desire of the Emperor and his naturalists for a voyage of scientific discovery were incompatible as a combined undertaking. The opposition of Bolts' Belgian former financial partners and now rivals in the Imperial Asiatic Company of Trieste and Antwerp was also a cause of its not going ahead, and in the autumn of 1782, it was abandoned. Instead of sending out a scientific expedition on an Austrian ship as Born had proposed, the Austrian naturalists under the leadership of Franz Jozef Maerter went from Le Havre in April 1783 on the American frigate General Washington (Captain Joshua Barney) to Philadelphia and thence to South Carolina, Florida, the Bahamas and Santo Domingo (Hispaniola). Besides plants, they were to collect animal and mineral specimens. Reflecting the origins of the enterprise, their instructions gave them the option (which was not taken up) to take ship from Acapulco in Mexico to the Philippines, thence to the Sunda Islands in the Dutch East Indies, the coasts of Bengal, Coromandel and Malabar, and the Iles de France and Bourbon (Mauritius and Reunion).

=== Bolts's approaches to Russia and Naples ===
Bolts refused to give up on his hopes for a voyage to the North West coast of America. Emperor Joseph II released Bolts from his obligations (except to his creditors) and gave him leave in November 1782 to take his proposal to the court of Catherine II of Russia. The Russian court proved unresponsive, so Bolts also put his proposal before the court of Joseph's brother-in-law, Ferdinand IV, King of Naples. He had an encouraging response from Naples, where King Ferdinand's Minister of Commerce and the Navy, General Sir John Acton, wanted to promote the kingdom's maritime trade. King Ferdinand gave Bolts a charter, modelled on that he had received from Empress Maria Theresa in 1776, with a term of twenty-one years from 1786, for a Royal Indian Company of Naples (Regia Società dell'India di Napoli), but the Neapolitan government agreed to support Bolts only after he had made a successful initial voyage at his own expense and risk. Preparations were begun in Marseille to fit out the Ferdinand, a ship Bolts planned to send to the North West Coast under the Neapolitan flag, but the venture was abandoned when Bolts received a more positive response from the French government.

=== Bolts and the Lapérouse expedition ===
With the Emperor's permission, Bolts also put his proposal to Joseph's other brother-in-law, Louis XVI of France. Bolts outlined his plan in letters he wrote to the Maréchal de Castries on 25 January and 9 April 1785. The Cobenzell would be sent around Cape Horn to the Sandwich Islands (Hawaii), Nootka Sound, the Kurile Islands, and China. The sloop would be left at Nootka to trade for furs, while a couple of Frenchmen would be left in the Kuriles to learn Japanese and adopt the dress and ways of the inhabitants. At least two ships would be employed to maintain communication with Europe via both the Cape of Good Hope and Cape Horn. A botanist, metallurgist, and astronomer would be employed. In the South Atlantic, Tristan da Cunha was to be claimed for France and settled as a base for the whaling industry.

In addition to Tristan, "the Island discovered by La Roche in 1675" (probably South Georgia) was to be found and settled. The French government adopted the concept, though not its author, leading to the sending out of an expedition under the command of Jean-François de Galaup, comte de Lapérouse. Charles Pierre Claret de Fleurieu, Directeur des Ports et Arsenaux, stated in the draft of the memorandum on the expedition he submitted to the King: "the utility which may result from a voyage of discovery ... has made me receptive to the views put to me by Mr. Bolts relative to this enterprise". However, as Fleurieu explained to the King: "I am not proposing at all, however, the plan for this voyage as it was conceived by Mr. Bolts". Political and strategic considerations took priority over the commercial. Bolts was paid 1,200 Louis for "the communications useful for the Service which he has given", but was given no part in the preparation or execution of the Lapérouse expedition.

=== The voyages of the Cobenzell to India and the Belgiojoso to China ===
At odds with his suspicious Antwerp backers, Bolts found himself declared bankrupt in mid-1782. Although he possessed no capital himself, he was able to trade on his reputation as an expert in the Eastern trade to launch a new share company in 1783, the Triestine Society, which in September sent the Cobenzell on a commercial voyage to the Malabar Coast by way of Marseilles, where she took in the principal part of her cargo, and the Cape of Good Hope. At Bombay, a second ship was purchased, called the Count of Belgiojoso. The captain of the Cobenzell, John Joseph Bauer, transferred to the Belgiojoso, and sailed on to China.

It was reported from Trieste on 22 February 1786 that "The Comte Cobenzel East Indiaman arrived in this port the 18th inst. with a rich cargo" of saltpeter, tea, cassia, camphire, coffee, pepper and other merchandise, having left Canton 23 January 1785. The Belgioioso under Bauer went from Canton to New York, where she arrived in June 1786. The ship's arrival from New York at Dover, England, was reported in The Daily Universal Register of 15 September, and the same newspaper published an extract of a letter from Ostend dated 24 September that said: "The Count de Belgioioso, on account of the East India Company, is arrived here from Bengal and China, her cargo consists chiefly of piece goods, with only a few chests of the finest teas, and one of spices, from Ceylon, at which island they touched on their way home".

=== The voyage of the Imperial Eagle ===
Having missed the opportunity provided by the American War of Independence to send a ship to the North West Coast undisturbed by competitors, Bolts was apparently able to share in the only voyage sent there under the Imperial flag, that of the Imperial Eagle, the former East Indiaman Loudoun, which in November 1786 sailed from Ostend under Charles William Barkley. Having cleared Ostend in November 1786, the Imperial Eagle made port at the Sandwich Islands in May 1787 and reached Nootka in June, from whence she traded southward for two months along the American coast. Barkley added significantly to knowledge of the geography of the area during this voyage, notably identifying the Strait of Juan de Fuca. He returned to Macao with his takings of furs on 5 November. The expedition was apparently profitable, as an article in The London Chronicle of 21 June 1788 reported that, "After taking in his cargo, &c. &c. Captain Berkeley [Barkley] proceeded to Macao, where he disposed of his furs at an amazing price". It was originally intended that the Imperial Eagle would make three voyages to the North West Coast, Japan, and Kamchatka, but when she reached Canton after her first season she was sold after threats were made from the East India Company for breaching its monopoly.

== Plan to colonize Australia 1786–1787 ==
In November 1786, Bolts was given a contract by King Gustav III of Sweden to discover an island off the coast of Western Australia, where a Swedish colony and trading post could be established. However, the plan was shelved after Sweden became embroiled in war with Russia the following year. Bolts was given 250 pounds for his trouble, and the proposed colony was never established.

== Final years ==
Bolts is said to have attempted to revive his fortunes in France, setting up an enterprise near Paris, but the outbreak of war once again destroyed his hopes. He returned to England in 1800, where he attempted unsuccessfully to interest the East India Company in obtaining supplies of copper from Anatolia to sell in India. He then moved to Lisbon where in the 1760s, before joining the East India Company, he had worked in the diamond trade. He made his last will in Lisbon in August 1805 and died, it is said, in a Paris poorhouse (hôpital) in 1808.
