= Austrian East India Company =

Austrian trading companies

- Type: Public
- Industry: International trade
- Founded: 1775
- Founder: William Bolts
- Defunct: 1785
- Area served: Worldwide

Austrian East India Company (German: Österreichische Ostindien-Kompanie) is a catchall term referring to a series of Habsburg trading companies based in Ostend and Trieste. The Imperial Asiatic Company of Trieste and Antwerp (French: Société impériale asiatique de Trieste et Anvers) and Asiatic Company of Trieste or the Trieste Company (Société asiatique de Trieste) were founded by William Bolts in 1775 and wound up in 1785.

== Establishment of the Company ==
In 1775, the then 37-year-old Dutch-born British merchant William Bolts offered his services to the Habsburg monarchy government of Empress Maria Theresa, putting forward a proposal for establishing Austrian trade with Company-ruled India from the Adriatic port of Trieste in present-day Italy. His proposal was accepted.

=== The voyage of the Giuseppe e Teresa, 1776–1781 ===
On 24 September 1776, Bolts sailed from Livorno in the dominions of Leopold, Grand Duke of Tuscany, the younger son of the Empress, to India in command of a ship under the flag of the Holy Roman Empire, the former Indiaman Earl of Lincoln, renamed the Giuseppe e Teresa (also called Joseph et Thérèse or Joseph und Theresia). He took with him a ten-year charter authorizing him to trade under Imperial colours between Austria’s Adriatic ports and Persia, India, China and Africa, and from Africa and Madagascar to America. This enterprise required substantial capital, which Bolts sought in the Austrian Netherlands (now Belgium), and he brought in the Antwerp banker, Charles Proli, and his associates, the bankers I.C.I. Borrikens and D. Nagel.

=== Colonisation of Delagoa Bay ===
Over the next few years Bolts established factories on the Malabar Coast in western India, on the southeast African coast at Delagoa Bay in modern-day Mozambique, and the Nicobar Islands.

His aim in establishing a factory at Delagoa Bay was to use it as a base for trade between east Africa and the west coast ports of India. He procured three ships to conduct this "country" trade, as trade by Europeans between India and other non-European destinations was called. During his voyage out he obtained Brazilian cochineal beetles in Portuguese Empire's Rio de Janeiro and transported them to Delagoa Bay, thereby predating the introduction to Bengal of this insect for the making of scarlet dyes and carmine. The Imperial flag did not fly for long over Delagoa Bay, as in April 1781 alarmed Portuguese authorities who claimed the place as their own sent a 40-gun frigate and 500 men from Goa to remove Bolts’s men, and to establish the presidio of Lourenço Marques (later renamed Maputo), an outpost that confirmed a permanent Portuguese presence there.

=== Activities in India, 1776–1781 ===
When it learned of Bolts's venture, the British East India Company (EIC) instructed its officers in Bengal, Madras, and Bombay to "pursue the most effectual means that can be fully justified to counteract and defeat" him.

Still, in 1774 the EIC had ceded Banki Bazaar on the Hooghli River, upstream from Calcutta, to the Ostend Company or Austrian East India Company. This was still in Austrian hands in 1794, but the British eventually took it over, probably shortly thereafter.

Bolts took full advantage of Austria’s neutral status in the war between Britain and France, Spain, and Holland (1778–1783) that formed part of the struggle for American independence. The Company's repeated acts of hostility against Bolts in India were the subject of urgent representations by the Austrian Ambassador in London, resulting in the sending in January 1782 of instructions from the Court of Directors to India, which ordered their officers in India not to give offence to "any subject of his Imperial Majesty".

Although when Bolt first arrived in India, at Surat, he was confronted with a wall of opposition erected by the East India Company, he soon made himself known to Hyder Ali, Nawab of Mysore and the strongest opponent of the English in India. He visited the Nawab at his capital, Seringapatam, where he was granted permission to establish trading factories in the Nawab’s Malabar Coast dominions at Mangalore, Karwar, and Baliapatam.

=== Colonisation of the Nicobar Islands ===
While Bolts himself was at Seringapatam, he sent the Joseph und Theresia to the Nicobar Islands, where she arrived in June 1778. There her captain, Bennet, took possession on 12 July. The islands were the focus of a Christian missionary effort of the Moravian Brethren, who visited from time to time from the Danish base on the Indian mainland at Tranquebar. In consequence of Bolts’s action, the Imperial company had established a trading factory on the island of Nancowery, headed by Gottfried Stahl who was accompanied by five other Europeans. Danish authorities strongly protested against Bolts’s action in taking possession of the Nicobars, and in 1783 sent a warship to remove the Austrians.

=== Dispute between Bolts and Proli ===
In spite of his many achievements since 1776, Bolts’s venture on the whole had made a loss, to the dismay of his Belgian financial backers, Charles Proli and his associates. Proli also disagreed with Bolts over the importance of the China market: Proli wanted to concentrate exclusively on that market, while Bolts urged the equal importance of India, as Austrian commodities such as mercury, lead, copper, iron, tin and vitriol could be sold there, in contrast to China where only Spanish silver dollars were accepted in return for Chinese products such as tea, porcelain and silk. While Bolts was still in India, the Proli group sent out two ships, the Ville de Vienne to Mauritius and the Prince Kaunitz to China, without informing him. In ignorance of Bolts’s purchase of another ship he also named Prince Kaunitz (after a prominent Habsburg statesman) the Proli group sent another ship of the same name to China independently of him.

This action constituted a breach of the Proli's contract with him. Proli refused to honour the bills Bolts drew upon their bank while he was in India. They petitioned the Austrian imperial government to have Bolts charter transferred exclusively to them. The Proli group also seized the Joseph et Therese as security when the vessel returned to Livorno. At an audience with Emperor Joseph II in Brussels on 28 July 1781, Bolt and Proli agreed to the transformation of their association into a share company, and in August Bolts surrendered his charters to the newly formed Imperial Company of Trieste and Antwerp for the Commerce of Asia (Société Impériale pour le Commerce Asiatique de Trieste et d’Anvers; SICATA). The new company was to send six ships to trade with China and India, two to East Africa and Mauritius, and another three to the Southern Ocean for whaling.

== Imperial Company of Trieste and Antwerp ==
The Imperial Company of Trieste and Antwerp (SICATA) was opened to public subscription in August 1781 to raise, nominally, half its capital in one thousand shares. In fact, the company was seriously under-capitalized, as the other thousand shares held by the Proli group and Bolts were paid for by the nominal value of the assets of the former association.

Bolts’s valuation of those assets was accepted at face value, but it was a fictitious valuation, and in fact the new company inherited the old company’s debts. It consequently suffered chronic lack of cash and had to resort to short term loans and bottomry bonds (for which the ships themselves were the collateral) at a premium of 30–35 percent.

Under these conditions, every voyage had to be a success for the company to remain viable. Also under the terms of the agreement, Bolts ceded his charter to his Belgian partners in return for a loan of 200,000 florins (that is, his 200 shares in the company) and the right to send two ships on his own account to China.

The Imperial Asiatic Company under the direction of the Proli group focussed on the China tea trade. In 1781, 1782 and 1783 the price of tea in Europe, especially in England, had risen to unheard of levels. In 1781 and 1782 no Dutch or French ships appeared at Guangzhou (back then known as "Canton") because of the ongoing American Revolutionary War, and in 1782 only eleven English, three Danish and two Swedish ships called there. Only four out of thirteen English ships returned safely in 1783, due to French naval activity. Attempting to seize the opportunity to make good profits, the Proli group sent five ships to Canton: the Croate, the Kollowrath, the Zinzendorff, the Archiduc Maximilien, and the Autrichien.

However, the opportunity had been missed as, with the signing of an armistice in January 1783 the former belligerents were able to send their ships to Canton safely, and the summer of 1783 saw a total of 38 foreign ships there, including the five Austrian vessels. They had to buy tea at a high price, and when they returned to Ostend in July 1784 they had to sell at a low price on a glutted market, as well as having to pay for permission to return to that port.

The price of tea at Ostend further collapsed when the British government introduced the Commutation Act 1784, which greatly reduced the tax on tea and made smuggling from the Netherlands unprofitable. The market price of tea in Europe fell suddenly from 30–33 French sols to just 11–14 sols. Disastrously, a sixth ship, the Belgioioso, carrying a large amount of silver coins for the purchase of Chinese goods, foundered in a storm in the Irish Sea soon after departing Liverpool, where she had been fitted out for the voyage to Canton.

Regardless of mounting losses, debts and liabilities, the company invested in a new ship, the Kaiserliche Adler or Aigle Impériale [Imperial Eagle], a giant of 1,100 tons, specially built for the company by the shipyards in Fiume (modern-day Rijeka) which was launched in March 1784, bringing the company’s fleet to a total of nine vessels. Matters came to a head in January 1785 when the company suspended all payments, and shortly afterwards it was declared bankrupt, bringing the Proli banking house down with it.

While some authors have claimed that Charles Proli consequently committed suicide, this fact is disputed as Proli was buried in consecrated ground on the former Cathedral of St. Gudula cemetery in Brussels. An article in the Dublin press of 25 May 1786 recorded the sale of the dissolved company’s ships, Zinderdorf [sic], Kollowrath, Kaunitz, Maximilian and Austrian, “together with their whole apparel, guns, stores, & c.” and observed: “The destruction of this company, as well as several others in Europe, is in a great measure owing to the commutation tea tax in England, and the advantages which territorial possessions throw in favour of the British company.”

== The Ostenders ==
The Imperial Company of Trieste and Antwerp flourished despite the opposition of its rivals, the English and Dutch East India Companies, during the period when Britain found itself at war with Holland and France as a development of the American War of Independence. The Imperial Company benefited from Austria’s neutrality during this conflict by being able to send its ships to Canton while its rival companies were prevented from doing so. When the war ended, the Dutch and English companies returned in a rush to Canton, which raised the price of Chinese tea and other goods there and caused a glut of them when the ships returned to Europe.

The trade from the Austrian Netherlands to India which had been recommenced by Bolts and the Imperial East India Company was continued after the collapse of that company in February 1785 by a group of Belgian and English merchants headed by the Vicomte Edouard de Walckiers, whose family had played a part in the story of the Ostend Company which traded to India earlier in the eighteenth century and who, together with the Marseilles banker Kick, had been one of the biggest shareholders in the Imperial Company.

The British merchants were mainly represented by the Brussels bankers, Charles Herries & Co. William Bolts’ company, referred to as the Société Triestine à Trieste, was apparently also connected with this group. From 1787, this association sent several ships to India from Ostend, the first of them being the St. Joseph. In the following years the ships Concordia, Prudencia, Belgioioso, Ville de Vienne, Henriette and Comtesse de Trautmannsdorff went to India. These voyages were undertaken exclusively to India, since the Chinese forbade trade to the Imperial flag until the debts which the Imperial Company had incurred in Canton, including 12% annual interest, were met. As Walckiers and his associates did not want to become involved in that matter, China remained closed to their trade, while India and Mauritius remained the destination of around a dozen ships, until the French Revolutionary Wars put an end to these enterprises in the mid-1790s.

== See also ==
- List of trading companies
