= Koma clan =

Korean royal family in Japan

Koma clan 高麗
- Parent house: House of Ko
- Titles: Various
- Founder: Jakkō
- Founding year: 666

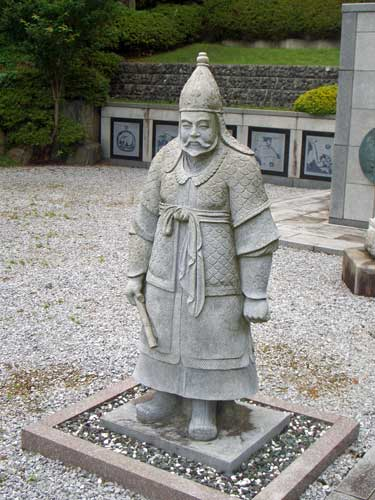
Statue of Jakkō at Koma shrine in Saitama

The Koma clan (高麗氏) was an immigrant from Korea that was active in Japan since the Asuka period. The clan claimed to be the royal family that descended from Prince Ko Yak'gwang (高若光) of Goguryeo, who became known as "Genbu Jakkō" (玄武若光) and later as "Koma no Jakkō" (高麗若光).

== History ==
Prince Ko Yak'gwang was a son of the 28th and last King of Goguryeo, Bojang. In 666, after a power struggle with his brothers or as refuge from Tang China's attack (opinion in dispute), he came to the old capital of Asuka in Japan during the reign of Emperor Tenji. Goguryeo fell to Tang China in 668 and in 699 his brother Ko Tŏngmu founded Lesser Goguryeo. The characters "高麗" can also be read as "Goryeo" (abbreviation of Goguryeo) instead of Koma.

In 703, the exiled prince Ko Yak'gwang (Jakkō) was given the court rank of Junior Fifth Rank, Lower Grade (ju go-i no ge, 従五位下) by Emperor Monmu and became a lower ranking official (Zaichokanin). In 716 A.D., Jakkō was instructed to gather the 1,799 Goguryeo refugees who initially came with him, from all over Japan and settle them in the wilderness of the Musashino Plain with a commanding view of the mountains (now known as Hidaka). Jakkō was to be their tribal chief and representative. When Jakkō died, the Koma Shrine was built to memorialize him. Next to the Koma Shrine, settlers from Goguryeo founded the Shoden-in Buddhist Temple to mark Jakkō's tomb.

For centuries, they thrived in the area and kept within their own family. The Koma Shrine remains a symbol of the ancient ties between Korea and Japan. Today, Jakkō's 60th linear descendant, Koma Fumiyasu, is a Shinto priest at his family's ancestral shrine. Built in Korea's shamanist tradition, the building took its present form when the Meiji government forced all worshipers to adopt state Shinto. It is one of hundreds of Shinto shrines across Japan that were built by Korean immigrants. The shrine became an important fixture in propagating the ancient ties between Korea and Japan. Today, the shrine serves as a symbol of friendship between Japan and Korea.

The Koma District that was given to the Goguryeo people stretched from the foothills of the mountains throughout the vast flatlands of Musashino all the way to today's Sayama city. For many centuries, the Koma people married only among their own clan, and they managed to stay out of most of the Japanese clan wars that later ravaged the country. They thrived and were a powerful force in their area. It was later believed that the Koma family had an influence on the origin of Samurai culture. They brought horses, iron weaponry, armor making skills, and other skills to Japan. After a few centuries following their arrival to Japan, horse-riding warriors started to emerge here and there with iron weaponry and armor in the Kanto area, which includes their settled district.

== Koma Shrine ==
Saitama Koma-jinja (埼玉 高麗神社) is located in Niihori, Hidaka City, Saitama Prefecture. The enshrined deities are Koma no Koshiki Jakkō, Sarutahiko no Mikoto and Takenouchi no Sukune (a legendary statesman). The shrine was founded in 716 by an emissary from Goguryeo, Jakkō, as the head shrine to guard the Koma district (present-day Hidaka City). It was originally named Shirahige Myojin and is the headquarters of all the 55 Shirahige and Shirahige Myojin shrines in the Musashi province (present-day Saitama Prefecture), from which it is also called Koma Soja Shrine (the head shrine). In the precinct are a lot of cultural properties including the Old Koma Family Residence. Since the Meiji period, a lot of people, who had visited this shrine to offer a prayer, became powerful politicians including prime ministers, the shrine has been worshipped as Shusse (career success) Myojin. Koma Shrine is also famous for cherry blossoms in spring and chrysanthemum flowers in fall. In 2016 the 1300th Anniversary of Koma shrine was held.

== Family Tree ==
King Bojang of Goguryeo (寶藏王/宝蔵王) (?–682) - last king of Goguryeo
 ┃
Prince Ko Yak'gwang (高若光) "Jakkō" (高麗若光) (?–?) - came to Japan in 666
 ┃
Koma no Kochō (高麗家重) (?–?) -
 ┃
Koma no Kojin (高麗弘仁) (?–?) -
 ┃
Koma no Seijin (高麗清仁) (?–?) -
 ┃
Koma no Koshō (高麗高照) (?–?) -
 ┃
Koma no Kotoku (高麗高德) (?–?) -
 ┃
Koma no Kotō (高麗弘道) (?–?) -
 ┃
Koma no Toshō (高麗道勝) (?–?) -
 ┃

== See also ==
- Goguryeo
- Little Goguryeo
- Koreans in Japan
- Japanese clans
- Ko Tŏngmu
- King Bojang

== Links ==
- Koma shrine Homepage
- Koma clan genealogy (in Japanese)
- The 1300th Anniversary of Koma
