= Goguryeo restoration movement =

Attempts to restore the Goguryeo kingdom

The Goguryeo restoration movement of 668–673 was Korean armed resistance against the Tang dynasty in an attempt to restore the Kingdom of Goguryeo, which had been disestablished by the Silla-Tang alliance in the Goguryeo–Tang War of 668.

== History ==
After the fall of Goguryeo in 668, the Goguryeo general Geom Mojam initiated a restoration movement in the Taedong River basin. After killing several Tang officials, he entered Silla territory. On his journey, Geom encountered Ansŭng, the grandson of King Bojang of Goguryeo. In 670, Geom installed Ansŭng as king, establishing his capital in present-day Chaeryong in an attempt to rebuild Goguryeo.

This new Goguryeo regime was greatly assisted by King Munmu of Silla. However, internal strife over how to respond to the Tang army led to Ansŭng's assassination of Geom in 670. In 671 the Tang general Gao Kan suppressed the resistance forces in Liaodong. In the next year, Gao's troops marched south to Pyongyang, conquered two rebel fortress, and defeated the Goguryeo-Silla alliance. Finally all resistance forces based on the former Goguryeo territory were pacified in 673.

== Later movements ==
After the failure of Ansŭng and Geom's resistance movement, the remnants and descendents of Goguryeo made various efforts to revive it.

=== Bodeok ===
After Ansŭng assassinated Geom, he surrendered to King Munmu, who gave him the title "King of Bodeok" in 674. Throughout the Silla-Tang War and during the initial Goguryeo restoration movement, King Munmu of Silla had built a coalition of Baekje, Goguryeo and Sillan soldiers utilized them against the Tang army. The Sillan army engaged Tang forces in combat to eject them from the Korean Peninsula south of the Taedong River and prevent any Tang attempts to control Silla, while Tang held control over former Goguryeo territory north of the Taedong River. The Sillan army at the Battle of Maeso was composed of Sillan soldiers, former prisoners issued amnesty in exchange for participating in the battle, as well as refugees from Goguryeo and Baekje.

Though the Kingdom of Bodeok was initially a stronghold for remnants of the Goguryeo population, in 684 Bodeok was abolished by Silla after the Goguryeo immigrants attempted a rebellion. In order to isolate the former Bodeok king from his base, Ansŭng was made to reside in the Silla capital of Seorabeol, where he was granted the official title of sop'an (소판; 蘇判), bestowed with the royal Sillan clan name of Kim (金). The Goguryeo people there were repopulated in various locales in the southern Korean Peninsula after Bodeok came to an end.

=== Parhae ===
Following the fall of Goguryeo, Dae Jo-yeong, along with his father Dae Jung-sang, gathered Goguryeo refugees in Yingzhou. He had to eventually flee from the Tang, and then united with the tribes of the Sumo Mohe located near the Songhua river. Historical sources give different accounts of Dae Joyeong's ethnicity and background. Both the Old Book of Tang and New Book of Tang describe Dae Joyeong as Mohe but differ on his relationship to Goguryeo. The Old Book describes him as gaoli biezhong, which has been translated as "branch of Koguryŏ people" or "separate kind" of Goguryeo people among many different translations. The New Book describes the state of Parhae and its ruling Dae clan as Mohe people who had submitted or attached themselves to Goguryeo. The Samguk yusa, a 13th-century collection of Korean history and legends, describes Dae as a Sumo Mohe leader. However, it gives another account of Dae being a former Goguryeo general, citing a now-lost Sillan record. Historian Richard McBride states that Dae was most likely an "ethnic Malgal/Mohe fully assimilated to Goguryeo culture, and thus able to rally support from both the remaining Goguryeo nobles and Malgal tribespeople."

Dae Jung-sang and Dae Joyeong allied themselves with Baishan Mohe leader Geolsa Biu, and won the Battle of Tianmenling. Though Jung-sang and Geolsa Biu were killed, Dae Joyeong went on to establish Parhae. The origins, legacy and history of Parhae are a historiographical dispute between Korea, China and Russia. Chinese and Russian historians claim that the rulers of Parhae were Mohe tribespeople, while Korean and Japanese historians claim that Parhae was the successor state to Goguryeo, and was founded by remnant Goguryeo military nobles who dominated a commoner class of Mohe peoples.

=== T'aebong and Goryeo ===
Following Silla's unification of the Three Kingdoms of Korea in 676 AD, its government pursued a national policy of integrating Baekje and Goguryeo refugees called the "Unification of the Samhan" with mixed results. Silla's rigid class structure as well as discrimination towards Baekje and Goguryeo peoples meant that they retained their respective collective consciousnesses and maintained a deep-seated resentment and hostility toward Silla. By the late 9th century, Silla fell into chaos as the central government collapsed and regional warlords arose. The military officer Kyŏn Hwŏn revived Baekje in 892 with the descendants of the Baekje refugees, and the Buddhist monk Kung Ye revived Goguryeo in 901 with the descendants of the Goguryeo refugees; these states together with Later Silla form the Later Three Kingdoms Later Goguryeo's initial name when it was founded was Goryeo, as old Goguryeo had shortened its name to Goryeo in the mid-5th century. Later Goguryeo originated in the northern regions of Later Silla, which, along with its capital located in modern-day Kaesong, North Korea, were the strongholds of the Goguryeo refugees. Among the Goguryeo refugees was Wang Kŏn, a member of a prominent maritime hojok based in Kaesong, who traced his ancestry to a great clan of Goguryeo.

Kung Ye showed signs of insanity and paranoia: he moved the capital, changed his country's name multiple times, changed his era name multiple times, and executed numerous subordinates and family members. In 918, Kung Ye was deposed by his own generals, and Wang Kŏn was raised to the throne. Wang Kŏn, who would posthumously be known by his temple name of Taejo or "Grand Progenitor", changed the name of his kingdom back to "Goryeo", adopted the era name of "Heaven's Mandate", and moved the capital back to his home of Kaesong. Goryeo regarded itself as the successor to Goguryeo and laid claim to Manchuria as its rightful legacy. One of Taejo's first decrees was to repopulate and defend the ancient Goguryeo capital of Pyongyang, which had been in ruins for a long time; afterward, he renamed it the "Western Capital", and before he died, he placed great importance on it in his Ten Injunctions to his descendants.

Goryeo would go on to defeat both Later Silla and Later Baekje in 935 and 936 respectively. Following Balhae's destruction in 926, the Parhae people had resisted the Liao dynasty. In 937, AD, the last crown prince of Balhae, Tae Kwanghyŏn and much of its ruling class, sought refuge in Goryeo, where they were warmly welcomed and given land by Taejo. In addition, Taejo included the Balhae crown prince in the Goryeo royal family, unifying the two successor states of Goguryeo and, according to Korean historians, achieving a "true national unification" of Korea.

== See also ==
- Paekche restoration movement
- Battle of Tianmenling
- Silla restoration movement
- Little Goguryeo

== Bibliography ==
- Sloane, Jesse D. (2014a), Parhae in Historiography and Archaeology: International Debate and Prospects for Resolution
