= Hotel del Luna =

2019 South Korean television series

- Promotional poster
- Hangul: 호텔 델루나
- RR: Hotel Delluna
- MR: Hot'el Telluna
- Genre: Dark fantasy; Romantic comedy; Tragicomedy
- Created by: Studio Dragon
- Written by: Hong Jung-eun; Hong Mi-ran
- Directed by: Oh Chung-hwan
- Starring: Lee Ji-eun; Yeo Jin-goo
- Country of origin: South Korea
- Original language: Korean
- No. of episodes: 16

Production
- Executive producer: Kim Kyu-tae
- Camera setup: Single camera
- Running time: 73–94 minutes
- Production company: GTist
- Budget: ₩16–20 billion

Original release
- Network: tvN
- Release: July 13 – September 1, 2019

Hotel del Luna (Korean: 호텔 델루나) is a South Korean television series starring Lee Ji-eun and Yeo Jin-goo as the owner and manager, respectively, of the eponymous hotel that caters only to ghosts. Produced by GTist, written by the Hong sisters and directed by Oh Chung-hwan, it aired on tvN from July 13 to September 1, 2019.

== Synopsis ==
Hotel del Luna (originally known as Guest House of the Moon) is a supernatural hotel that caters exclusively to ghosts. Hidden from ordinary human view during the day, it can be seen in its true form only under special circumstances. Its guests are spirits who have unresolved matters from their former lives and remain there until they are able to move on to the afterlife and reincarnation. The hotel's staff are likewise bound to the premises, many of them having remained there for decades or centuries because they have not yet resolved their own lingering grudges.

An exception is the position of general manager, which is always held by a human. Because the hotel must occasionally deal with the living world, the manager acts as an intermediary in matters such as finances and requests involving the ghosts' surviving relatives or acquaintances.

The hotel's owner is Jang Man-wol, who has been bound to it for more than a thousand years as punishment for a grave sin committed in the past. Through the intervention of the deity Magu, Man-wol makes an arrangement with Gu Chan-sung's father: in return for sparing his life, Chan-sung is promised to the hotel twenty years later.

Although his father attempts to prevent this fate by taking him abroad, Gu Chan-sung eventually returns to South Korea after his father's death. By then an accomplished and rational hotelier, he becomes involved with Man-wol once again and is compelled to honor the agreement by taking up the post of general manager at Hotel del Luna.

As Chan-sung adapts to his new role, the history of the hotel and the truth about Man-wol's past are gradually revealed.

== Cast ==
=== Main ===
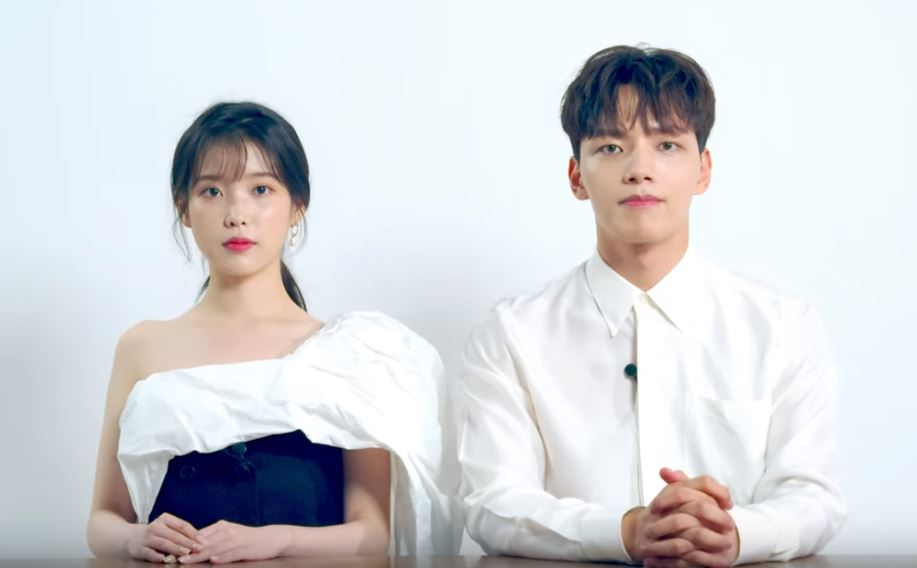
Lee Ji-eun and Yeo Jin-goo during a photoshoot for Hotel del Luna

- Lee Ji-eun as Jang Man-wol
  - Kim Gyu-ri as young Jang Man-wol

The moody owner of Hotel del Luna (Guest House of the Moon). She was condemned to this fate in order to atone for the sins she committed 1,300 years ago. Alternating between being aloof and bad-tempered, she is known for her love of extravagant things, particularly luxurious outfits, fast cars, and expensive champagne.

- Yeo Jin-goo as Gu Chan-sung
  - Kim Kang-hoon as young Gu Chan-sung

The new general manager of Hotel del Luna. He is a Harvard MBA graduate hired as an assistant manager at one of Korea's top hotels. However, due to a deal his father made with Jang Man-wol twenty-one years earlier, Chan-sung is forced to become the general manager of Hotel del Luna. Being stoic and rational puts him at odds with Man-wol, particularly when he curbs her spendthrift and extortionist tendencies.

=== Supporting ===
==== At the Hotel del Luna ====
- Jung Dong-hwan as Noh Joon-suk

The hotel's general manager for 30 years and Chan-sung's predecessor. He considers Man-wol a sister, daughter and friend.

- Shin Jung-geun as Kim Seon-bi

The employee who has been at the hotel for the longest time and the Sky Bar's bartender. In life, he was a Joseon scholar who died just as he passed the state exam.

- Bae Hae-sun as Choi Seo-hee

The housekeeper and room service provider with an extrovert personality. She lived 200 years prior during the Joseon era as a nobleman's wife but met a sticky end.

- Pyo Ji-hoon as Ji Hyun-joong

The hotel receptionist. He is nice and polite, but does not like his job. He was a student who died at the height of the Korean War after being drafted; he is waiting for his younger sister, who is still alive, to pass from old age.

- Kang Mi-na as spirit of Jung Soo-jung / Kim Yoo-na

A rich and arrogant student whose body ends up being inhabited by the spirit of Jung Soo-jung, a schoolmate whom Yoo-na bullied and accidentally killed. When Yoo-na's spirit is destroyed, Soo-jung decides to remain inside Yoo-na's body and assumes her identity.

==== People around Jang Man-wol ====
- Lee Do-hyun as Go Chung-myung

A Later Silla royal guard captain who becomes a friend of Man-wol and Yeon-woo.

- Lee Tae-sun as Yeon-woo / Officer Park Young-soo

The co-leader of the bandits and Man-wol's adopted brother. He is reincarnated as police detective Park Young-soo.

==== People around Gu Chan-sung ====
- Cho Hyun-chul as Sanchez

Chan-sung's best friend since they were studying at Harvard. He is the son of a wealthy pizza franchise operator, running the branch in Seoul. Generous to a fault, he opens up his house to both Chan-sung and Lee Mi-ra.

- Park Yoo-na as Princess Song-hwa / Lee Mi-ra

A ruthless Later Silla princess who engineers Man-wol's downfall and the destruction of those she loves. After spending several centuries atoning for her sins, she is reincarnated as Lee Mi-ra, a doctor and Chan-sung's ex-girlfriend from his university days. As Mi-ra, she is friendly and popular but still has a habit of taking advantage of others, which drove Chan-sung to leave her.

- Lee David as Seol Ji-won

A rich young man and Chan-sung's schoolmate at Harvard. He holds a grudge against both Chan-sung and Sanchez. He is later revealed to be a psychopathic serial killer who murdered at least seven people whose souls became guests of Hotel Del Luna.

==== Others ====
- Seo Yi-sook as Magu

A goddess who controls the life and death of people passing through the hotel and appears in many forms.

- Kang Hong-seok as Grim Reaper

A spirit who guides the souls staying at the hotel to the afterlife and captures wandering evil spirits.

- Song Duk-ho as Oh Tae-seok

A soldier who runs away from the war.

=== Special appearances ===
- Oh Ji-ho as Chan-sung's father
- Kim Won-hae as a mayor
- Lee Chae-kyung as a hotel CEO
- Nam Kyoung-eub as Chairman Wang
- Lee Joon-gi as a priest
- Lee Si-eon as an astronaut
- Jo Hyun-sik as a hotel guest
- Hong Kyung as a baker
- Kim Mi-eun as Lee Soo-min
- Lee Yi-kyung as Yu Oh
- Pyo Ye-jin as an actress
- Kim Jun-hyun as himself (Ep. 6)
- Park Jin-joo as Gyeong-ah
- Nam Da-reum as Spirit of the Well
- Sulli as Jung Ji-eun
- Choi Yoo-song as the spirit of Chan-sung's mother
- Seo Eun-soo as Veronica
- Hwang Young-hee as Hwang Moon-sook
- Lee Seung-joon as a doctor
- So Hee-jung as the doctor's wife
- Kim Seung-han as the doctor's son
- Lee Min-young as a ghost
- Kim Soo-hyun as the new owner of the Guest House of the Moon, renamed "Hotel Blue Moon"

== Episodes ==
No. overall	No. in season	Original release date
1	1	July 13, 2019
1,300 years in the past, Jang Man-wol travels through the wilderness escorting a cart that bears a coffin. She encounters an old woman and explains that she's seeking a guest house that comforts the souls of the dead. The old woman knows the place and Man-wol demands that she tell her how to find it. The old woman says that only the dead can go there — like the ghosts she sees following Man-wol. The woman vanishes and a large dead tree appears. A windstorm suddenly blows up and the debris it carries assemble into a large guest house. From a distance, the old woman, who is the deity Magu, announces that the Guest House of the Moon has a new owner. Magu brings the coffin to the house, followed by a swarm of fireflies. In 1998, a young Gu Chan-sung and his impoverished father meet Magu in the guise of a flower seller. In front of them, the body of a murdered police officer, Detective Lee, is pulled from the river. Her ghost finds its way to the guest house, now the luxurious Hotel del Luna. Jang Man-wol is still the proprietor, now prosperous, and with a taste for champagne and luxuries. Most of the staff are ghosts who for their own reasons have not moved on to the next world. After awhile, Chan-sung's father, fleeing the police, falls down some stairs, and his spirit also finds its way to the hotel. Not realizing his circumstances, he wanders the hotel, looking for a place to hide and contemplating robbing it. He is caught in the garden by Man-wol, who returns him to the living in exchange for his son in twenty years. The tree has blossoms for the first time. Detective Lee explains to Man-wol that she's not ready to move on to the next world until the person responsible for killing her is brought to justice. She digs a bullet out of her head and gives it to Man-wol. Later, Man-wol walks into an award ceremony with an ornate rifle over her shoulder. Only the mayor can see her. She shoots him with the ghost bullet. He's not harmed, but he begins to see the ghost of Detective Lee whose death he had ordered. In the present day, Gu Chan-sung returns to South Korea with a degree in hotel management and a Harvard MBA. He takes a job at a top hotel, but Man-wol finds him and tells him to work for her instead. He resists. Later he sees the ghost of an eyeless woman who begins to pursue him. Man-wol shows up and rescues him. The mayor, now a homeless vagabond, recognizes Man-wol and stabs her. As she lies on the street, she tells Chan-sung that this is his chance to walk away and be rid of her. Instead, he comes back with a cart to take her to a hospital. She reveals that she's not actually hurt, and that the mayor was a vengeful ghost whom she then destroys.
2	2	July 14, 2019
Magu appears, giving flowers to the recently dead as they begin their journey to the next world. The eyeless woman resumes following Chan-sung. The ghost of a tiger is haunting the city. Chan-sung visits the hotel, where he meets the staff, including Mr. Noh, the current manager who is retiring. Man-wol explains that the hotel needs a human manager to deal with the human world. Man-wol and Chan-sung investigate the tiger, which was brought to the city by Chairman Wang, owner of the hotel where Chan-sung currently works. The chairman is in poor health and haunted by nightmares of the tiger. Man-wol and Chan-sung visit him, and she offers to rid him of the tiger in exchange for a valuable painting of Mount Paektu. Chan-sung is put off by her averice. Chan-sung meets Mr. Noh again, and over tea Mr. Noh explains that working at the hotel is worth it. Chan-sung realizes that Mr. Noh has died and he has been talking to his ghost. Mr. Noh returns to the hotel one more time, as a guest. He says his goodbyes to Man-wol and the staff, and departs for the next life. Chairman Wang gives the painting to Man-wol; she uses it to give the ghost of the tiger a home. Chan-sung, having overcome his fear of the eyeless woman, brings her to the hotel and shows her that she doesn't need to be blind any more. The next evening, he is attacked by another vengeful ghost and is saved by Man-wol.
3	3	July 20, 2019
In a flashback, Man-wol is the leader of a group of bandits. The band robs a caravan belonging to Princess Song-hwa. She meets Go Chung-myung, the captain of the guard and they form a connection. In various flashbacks throughout the series, we see them falling in love. Man-wol and Magu talk in the garden. After Man-wol leaves, Magu touches the tree and it blossoms again. She places the blossoms on Chan-sung as he sleeps, and he dreams of Man-wol when she was happy. Man-wol shows him the rest of the hotel and he decides to stay. She smiles and he knows for sure she's the woman from his dream. A teenage girl, Jung Soo-jung, falls to her death from a bridge. Her ghost possesses the body of Kim Yoo-na, the girl who killed her in a fight over a necklace. Kim's ghost comes to Chan-sung looking for help to get her body back. Later, he accosts Soo-jung in Yoo-na's body and gets her side of the story. Man-wol visits Yoo-na's parents and sells them the necklace so they can destroy it and cover up the murder. She warns them that destroying the necklace will destroy their daughter's soul. Not understanding, they destroy the necklace anyway, and Yoo-na's soul turns to ash. Soo-jung continues to live in Yoo-na's body and assumes her identity. Chan-sung worries about the eventual fate of Man-wol's soul. He tells her of his dream, and she recognizes it as true. Chan-sung wonders if she stayed at the hotel for so long because she's waiting for someone.
4	4	July 21, 2019
Chan-sung touches the tree and it leafs out to Man-wol's amazement. She remembers Magu telling her that when the tree comes back to life, time will start flowing for her again. She becomes upset. She orders Chan-sung to go to sleep again to have another dream. Chan-sung wonders if he might be the man from the dream. A bakery is visited by the eyeless ghost, causing a brief panic. Chan-sung's roommate Sanchez, who was out buying bread, comes home to tell the story to Chan-sung. The ghost has followed him and Chan-sung converses with her in front of Sanchez. Now that she can see, she wants to look at a baker who was kind to her in life, but she will only recognize him by touching his hands. The staff sees the tree and become concerned that it means that Man-wol will leave soon, and that they too may be required to take the bus to the afterlife. Chan-sung helps the ghost find the baker. Man-wol tells Chan-sung that he missed something important: the thing that ghosts remember best is how they died. The eyeless ghost remembers that the baker is the one who killed her in a hit-and-run accident. She gets onto his motorcycle intending revenge. Chan-sung saves the baker and convinces the ghost not to take revenge. She goes to the next life and Chan-sung sees to it that the baker goes to jail. Man-wol and the staff plot to get rid of Chan-sung to stop the tree from blooming. They consider Yoo-na for his replacement. They decide to send Chan-sung to visit the ghost in room 13, the sight of whom will drive him mad. At the last moment, Man-wol appears and kisses Chan-sung to keep him from looking at the ghost. The kiss lingers.
5	5	July 27, 2019
Man-wol orders Chan-sung to flee while she deals with the ghost. The ghost tricks Chan-sung into thinking Man-wol needs to be rescued and he rushes back in, allowing the ghost to escape. The staff realizes their plot has failed disastrously. Yoo-na and Ji Hyun-joong meet. He explains that she's being considered for the job of manager. They flirt and exchange phone numbers. Chan-sung tells Man-wol about a dream where he saw her with Yeon-woo. They wonder briefly if Chan-sung might be the reincarnation of Yeon-woo, but decide he's not. Man-wol is sad as she remembers her time with Yeon-woo. A grieving couple perform a ritual that will find a groom for their dead daughter Lee Soo-min. They send a red pouch off under a paper sky lantern. Whoever finds it will be tied to the dead bride's ghost. The ghost of Soo-min doesn't want this, but cannot stop them. She comes to the hotel for help. Man-wol realizes Soo-min's family is wealthy and offers to host the wedding at their expense. Chan-sung looks for the red pouch to prevent some innocent stranger from finding it. Man-wol realizes that if he finds it, he will be the groom and goes to stop him. She arranges for Sanchez to find it instead. Sanchez finds it and discovers a red string tied to his hand leading off into the distance. He sees Soo-min's ghost and faints. Man-wol explains that once the wedding is held, Soo-min will move on to the afterlife and Sanchez will be fine. Chan-sung goes to Magu for advice and meets two of her sisters. They agree that the wedding should proceed, but suggest that another ghost could be substituted for Sanchez. Chan-sung begins the search for a suitable groom. Soo-min doesn't like any of the choices and instead gives the bag to Chan-sung. Just before the wedding, Chan-sung has a vision: Man-wol from 1,300 years ago, wearing a red wedding gown, blood dripping from her fingertips. The third Magu sister appears with a gift for the bride. Man-wol sends Yoo-na to find the original groom. Yoo-na finds him in a hospital waiting room, tells him about the upcoming wedding and offers to help him stop it. She brings him to the hotel. Chan-sung hands him the red bag and the string now ties him to Soo-min. The wedding begins. Man-wol explains that when the wedding is finished, the man will die and go to the afterlife with her. We learn that the grieving couple were the groom's parents, not the bride's. They tried to arrange for the ghost wedding to prevent Soo-min from taking their son with her to the afterlife. The son is actually in a hospital, dying, and it was his soul that came to the hotel. At the last moment, Soo-min calls a halt to the wedding so that the groom may live. The wedding gift from Magu turns out to be a pair of scissors that can cut the string. In the hospital, the groom wakes up, tears in his eyes. Lee Mi-ra, Chan-sung's ex-girlfriend shows up. She is the reincarnation of Princess Song-hwa. Man-wol asks the Grim Reaper why Magu is helping Chan-sung, and he responds that Magu is helping her, adding that he will be the one to see her off.
6	6	July 28, 2019
The staff confer with the Grim Reaper over the escape of the ghost from room 13. The Grim Reaper says he will hold the hotel responsible if anything happens. A man working late at the office receives a message that leads him to a spy-cam video of a woman in a bedroom. It is the ghost from room 13. She reaches through the screen and kills him. Later, she claims a second victim. The ghost of a king arrives at the hotel and is given royal treatment. However Chan-sung becomes suspicious as nobody is entirely sure which king he was. The king turns out to be the actor Bang Tae-woo, who died before he had the chance to play his greatest role. The actor who replaced him is not up to the part. Man-wol and Chan-sung arrange for Tae-woo to briefly possess the younger actor, allowing him play the part perfectly, saving the younger actor's career and allowing Tae-woo to move on to the next life. Man-wol and Chan-sung have plans to go to the coast, but she finds out that Chan-sung is having lunch with Mi-ra. We learn that Mi-ra and Chan-sung do not have a good relationship and that he is angry about their past. Chan-sung spots Kim Jun-hyun, a celebrity that Man-wol is a fan of, and gets an autograph for her. He calls her to confirm their trip to the coast and she tells him not to bother. The next day, Chan-sung finds Man-wol sitting alone at the hotel beach and gives her the autograph. She's happy with his gift, and happy that he's there.
7	7	August 3, 2019
Yoo-na encounters another Magu sister, a stern woman in black, who intends to destroy her for inhabiting someone else's body. The Grim Reaper intervenes, explaining that Man-wol had given permission. Man-wol and the staff discuss how to track the ghost from room 13. Meanwhile, the ghost claims a third victim. Chan-sung interviews the sister of the ghost and discovers that she had died after a sex video of her was distributed at college. The three victims are students who were behind the distribution of the sex video. The person who made the recording, Jeong Eun-seok, is now the CEO of a successful file-sharing site. Chan-sung and Man-wol confront him. Afterwards, Man-wol tells Chan-sung that there's no more to be done; Magu will take care of it now. The ghost attacks Eun-seok but Magu in black intervenes, destroying the ghost. As the ghost's ashes ascend into the sky, Man-wol bears silent witness. Man-wol invites Eun-seok to visit the hotel. Chan-sung shows him to room 13, which now looks like the room from the video. It is Eun-seok's room from college. Eun-seok wakes up in his car, stalled on railroad tracks. Man-wol is there. She forces him to remember what he did. A train comes. A moment later, he is alone in the car and the train is not there. Magu in black appears, and this time the train comes for real. Out with Chan-sung, Man-wol sees Mi-ra for the first time and recognizes her as the reincarnation of Princess Song-hwa.
8	8	August 4, 2019
In a flashback, Man-wol murders Song-hwa on the night of her wedding to Chung-myung. Upon seeing Mi-ra, Man-wol concludes that the deities had no intention of letting her go from the beginning. Man-wol obtains Mi-ra's purse and finds a number of personal items including a photograph of a happy childhood memory. Man-wol and Magu discuss Mi-ra. Magu urges Man-wol to just let Mi-ra pass by, and warns her to not cause harm. Mr. Kim and Ms. Choi tell Chan-sung about Man-wol's connection to the hotel. She can never leave; wherever she goes, the Moon Tree will set down roots and there stands the Guest House of the Moon. Man-wol nearly became a vengeful ghost, but Magu brought her to the hotel. The hotel is both a prison and a fence as it keeps Man-wol safe. Mi-ra recovers her purse, but the photo is missing. On a high balcony, Man-wol and Chan-sung talk about the day. He says they should do nice things together, adding that the view is much better now that he's with her. He promises that no matter what, he will stay. Man-wol invites Mi-ra to visit the hotel. There, Man-wol uses the photo to recreate an unhappy childhood memory with the intent of taking Mi-ra's happiness away. Chan-sung appears, and unable to get Man-wol to call off the curse, he takes it onto himself to save Mi-ra. He collapses to the floor while Man-wol weeps, remembering his promise to never leave. Man-wol sends Mi-ra home, unharmed and with no memory of what happened. She then burns the photo, releasing Chan-sung from the curse. In a flashback, Man-wol and Chung-myung agree that they can never be together and depart, she to rejoin the bandits and he to marry Princess Song-hwa. The next day, he betrays them all and Man-wol is forced to watch as her friends are executed. Chung-myung tells her that he had used her to find the bandits. Later, she escapes, murders Princess Song-hwa on her wedding night and waits for Chung-myung, dressed in Song-hwa's wedding gown. He arrives and she reaches for her sword. Chan-sung wakes up in his own bed, having been asleep for three days. Man-wol has left the Baekdu Mountain painting for him. Sanchez is concerned and asks if Man-wol is going somewhere. Chan-sung rushes back to the hotel only to find it gone.
9	9	August 10, 2019
Mr. Kim asks Man-wol if she's worried about going to the next life peacefully without Chan-sung to help. She replies that she'll never be allowed to leave peacefully and it's best if Chan-sung is not there when the time comes. Yoo-na and Hyun-joong spot a ghost in the back of a car on the freeway, signaling for help. They follow the car into the woods and encounter several more ghosts. They realize that they've discovered a serial killer. The next day, police are at the site, uncovering bodies. One of the police detectives, Park Young-soo, is the reincarnation of Yeon-woo. Chan-sung visits Magu and asks if she can help him find the hotel's new location. Instead, she offers him medicine which will take away his ability to see ghosts or the hotel. If he takes it, he will be free of Man-wol and the hotel for good. He accepts the gift, but decides to think about it first. Walking near the hotel's new location, Man-wol meets the guardian spirit of the local well. He shows interest in the hotel. Chan-sung gets Man-wol on the phone and offers to come back. She hesitates, but finally refuses. Chan-sung encounters the ghost of Chairman Wang who has recently died. Wang tells him that his company will pay a good price for the painting to use in a memorial. He expresses an interest in seeing the hotel. Chan-sung quickly agrees and follows Chairman Wang to find the hotel. Man-wol becomes angry when she finds out that the painting will fetch a good price with none of it going to her. The guardian of the well appears at the hotel, and mistaking him for a ghost, Chan-sung invites him in. The village well dries up while the guardian refuses to leave the hotel, claiming that the villagers no longer care about the well and he is unappreciated. Sanchez and Mi-ra host a small school reunion. Seol Ji-won attends. He is the serial killer. Man-wol asks Chan-sung why he came back. He tells her it's because she hesitated earlier when he offered to return. He knew that she wanted him back. Chan-sung solves the guardian's problem by bringing him to the spring in the garden at Chairman Wang's villa. Chan-sung throws the medicine into the spring too, to demonstrate his commitment to stay with Man-wol to the end.
10	10	August 11, 2019
The guardian appears and returns the medicine. Chan-sung refuses it, so Man-wol takes it. Chan-sung meets Chairman Wang's daughter and granddaughter. Chan-sung offers to let them write a letter to him which Chan-sung can deliver. Mr. Kim and Chairman Wang decide that Chan-sung would make a good husband for Chairman Wang's granddaughter, and play matchmaker. The third Magu sister also plays matchmaker and arranges for Young-soo and Mi-ra to meet. Chan-sung and the granddaughter begin to go out together and seem to develop feelings for each other, but in the end Chan-sung tells her there's someone else. Man-wol and Chan-sung investigate a ghost who is haunting the local library. Chan-sung discovers that it's his mother who had abandoned him as a baby. Man-wol brings Chan-sung's mother to the hotel and reinstates Chan-sung as general manager so he can see her off to the next life. The hotel returns to its previous location. Seeing Young-soo and Mi-ra together, Chan-sung suddenly remembers both of them from his dream. He is shocked and wonders what is going on. Later, he takes Man-wol to see Young-soo. She is glad to see he is living a good life. They briefly lock eyes, and Man-wol gives a sad smile. Chan-sung and Man-wol meet in the garden. She admits that she wanted him to return. She wants him with her until she vanishes. He says he won't let that happen. He brushes a tear from her cheek and takes her in his arms. She returns the embrace. The tree blossoms.
11	11	August 17, 2019
The staff see the tree and know they will have to leave soon. Later, a lone firefly is flying among the branches. Young-soo and his team close in on the serial killer, but they have the wrong suspect. Yoo-na interviews the ghosts of the victims to attempt to track down the real killer. Meanwhile, Ji-won is tracking Yoo-na. Chan-sung meets Hwang Man-suk, a powerful politician. She asks him to take her to the hotel to meet with Man-wol. She explains that she was the manager of the hotel before Mr. Noh. The staff are thrilled to see her again. She asks Man-wol a favor: during a lunar eclipse, humans can see the hotel and see the ghosts inside if they enter. When Ms. Hwang was the manager, a newlywed couple came to the hotel to get out of the rain, and Man-wol let them stay the night. The child they conceived became successful and famous, and is now engaged to Ms. Hwang's daughter. Ms. Hwang would like them to stay in the hotel during the upcoming lunar eclipse for good luck. Man-wol agrees and the staff are excited to be having human guests. Sanchez is looking forward to a visit from his girlfriend Veronica, and plans to propose when she arrives. He wants to propose at Hotel del Luna, but Chan-sung tells him it's not possible. On the night of the full moon, Veronica fails to appear, and Sanchez learns that she was in a serious accident. As Sanches rushes to leave, Chan-sung sees Veronica's ghost at the house. He convinces Sanchez to come to the hotel so he can see Veronica while the eclipse is still ongoing. They manage to say goodbye before the eclipse ends. Yoo-na tracks Ji-won down and calls Chan-sung to tell him. He rushes to the location. Meanwhile, Man-wol encounters Magu in black who hints that Chan-sung is in danger, and tells Man-wol that her flowers will begin to fall when she becomes afraid. Blossoms begin to fall from the tree as Chan-sung finds himself face to face with Ji-won.
12	12	August 18, 2019
Ji-won tries to kill Chan-sung and they struggle. Yoo-na returns to Ji-won's location to find it cordoned off with police tape. She calls the hotel and soon the staff is frantic with the news that Chan-sung is dead. Chan-sung arrives in the lobby dazed but alive. Man-woll is shocked by how much she worried. Chan-sung explains that he had alerted Young-soo before going, and Young-soo had arrived just in time. Ji-won is in custody now. Man-wol returns from the pharmacy stocked up on first aid and tends to Chan-sung's injuries. She admits how worried she was. Man-wol tells the story of how she was a young child dying in the wilderness and was found by a passing merchant. She was then taken in by Yeon-woo's mother and they grew up as brother and sister. She says she's never talked about her past before, and adds that maybe it's time for the flowers to fall. Ji-won escapes and makes his way to the roof. Chan-sung goes up to speak to him. Ji-won jumps from the roof and immediately becomes a vengeful ghost so powerful that even Man-wol cannot destroy him. Magu and the Grim Reaper contemplate the Moon Tree. Magu says that when the flowers fall, Man-wol can finally go to the afterlife, as well as the person who remained as a small light. We see the firefly flitting among the branches. They reveal that the firefly is Chung-myung, who turned back when Magu was escorting him to the afterlife and chose to remain behind to keep a promise to Man-wol. In flashbacks, we learn that Chung-myung betrayed Man-wol and the bandits because it was the only way to save himself and his people. Sanchez returns from Veronica's funeral, not coping very well. Chan-sung is also having trouble coping with Sanchez's grief. Man-wol reminds him that he will have to be the one who sends her off, and if he cannot tell her he'll be fine when the time comes, she'll be too scared. He tells her that he knows this is the price he will have to pay for staying by her side. Man-wol tells Chan-sung that the flowers are falling and she's scared. The petals vanish before they reach the ground and she's afraid she too will vanish without a trace. He tells her he loves her. They kiss. Petals begin landing on the ground.
13	13	August 24, 2019
A guest arrives at the hotel, and Ms. Choi recognizes him as the last descendant of the Yeongju Yun family. With his death, the family line is now finished. Her 200-year wait is over. Ms. Choi attends the funeral, but then a pregnant woman, Su-jin, arrives and Ms. Choi realizes the family line may not have ended after all. Man-wol tells Chan-sung that as the dead cross the bridge to the next life, they lose their memories of their previous life one by one. She promises Chan-sung that she will remember him until the last step. In the garden, the firefly waits in the tree. Chan-sung asks Man-wol if she is still waiting for Chung-myung to return. In flashbacks, we see the firefly staying near Man-wol over the centuries. Su-jin begins to have a miscarriage. Her boyfriend's ghost begs Ms. Choi to get help, but she realizes that by standing by and doing nothing, she can see the Yun family finally end. Man-wol suggests she go and watch. Upon seeing Su-jin's suffering, Ms. Choi's heart softens and she gets help. Later, she tells Chan-sung the story of how she was cast out of the family for not bearing a son, and murdered alongside her baby daughter. As she died, she cursed the Yun family to also die out. By saving Su-jin's child, she prevented the family from ending. Man-wol is shocked to discover that Mi-ra and Young-soo are dating — someone she hated and someone she cared for. In a flashback, we see a sword fight between Man-wol and Chung-myung. At the end, before she can kill him, he throws himself on her sword. He strokes her hair as he dies. Ms. Choi asks Hyun-joong when he intends to tell Yoo-na that when his younger sister — now an old woman — dies, he intends to go to the afterlife with her. Looking for a lost child, Chan-sung runs into the tunnel that leads to the afterlife and becomes lost. The firefly appears and takes the form of Chung-myung. Later, Chan-sung comes back out of the tunnel in a daze. Man-wol runs into his arms and he strokes her hair exactly as Chung-myung had done. Man-wol steps back, stares at him, and asks "Who ... are you?"
14	14	August 25, 2019
In a flashback, Chung-myung saves the bandits' possessions from being burned and has them collected in a coffin instead. Chan-sung snaps out of his daze and asks Man-wol who was that man. They both wonder if Chan-sung is the reincarnation of Chung-myung. Chan-sung tells Man-wol of his latest dream, in which he saw Chung-myung waiting for her by the lake. Yoo-na encounters Hyun-joong's sister in the hospital and chats with her. An older man arrives and identifies himself as Hyun-joong, her brother, and Yoo-na becomes confused. She says that she thought Hyun-joong died, and the old man becomes rattled. Hyun-joong whisks her away. Ms. Choi speaks with Chan-sung. She realizes that Chan-sung has brought people from Man-wol's past life to her. She asks if Chan-sung is someone who knew Man-wol in that life, but Chan-sung says no. Ms. Choi wonders why Magu chose Chan-sung. Magu asks Man-wol if she will let Chung-myung pass by, adding that he's already here, by her side. Man-wol asks if Chan-sung is Chung-myung. Magu refuses to answer, but asks if he is, will Man-wol see him as the man she hates and vanish, or the man she loves and be saved? Magu gives Man-wol the hairpin that Chung-myung had made for her but was never able to give to her. It is covered in Chung-myung's blood and is ill-omened. Chan-sung asks the Grim Reaper who the first guest of the hotel was. The Grim Reaper only answers that he has not yet escorted that guest to the afterlife. Man-wol gives the hairpin to Ji-won's ghost, making him more powerful. She explains that she knows Chan-sung is the reincarnation of Chung-myung, and since she can't bring herself to kill him, she will let Ji-won do it instead. She accepts that this will mean her destruction. She returns to the hotel and barricades herself in the garden. Magu in black appears. Chan-sung goes to the second Magu sister to ask if it's really true that he is Chung-myung. She tells him no, and shows him the firefly, now trapped in a jar. She adds that he was the first guest at the hotel. Chan-sung recovers the hairpin from Ji-won and the Grim Reaper finally catches Ji-won. Chan-sung arrives in the garden in time to prevent Magu from destroying Man-wol. Ms. Choi brings Ji-won to meet the ghosts of the people he murdered. She stands outside the door as his screams are heard. Man-wol invites Mi-ra and Young-soo to the hotel and Mr. Kim serves them drinks that will allow them to remember their past lives. Mi-ra remembers herself as Princess Song-hwa telling Chung-myung that her father suspects him of being in league with the rebels and that he and everyone he knows will be executed. But if he captures the bandits, her father will no longer suspect him. Young-soo remembers his life as Yeon-woo and the day Chung-myung captured him. Chung-myung explains that he's doing this to save as many lives as he can from being executed. Yeon-woo tells Chung-myung to save Man-wol and never reveal the truth to her. In the garden, Magu tells Man-wol that Chung-myung was the first guest of the hotel and has always been there. Man-wol is not the only one who has been paying for her sins. In a flashback, Man-wol swears to Chung-myung that she will kill him at all costs. He replies that to do that, she will have to stay alive. Later, he watches in shame as the bandits are executed. Man-wol says Chung-myung's name for the first time in 1,300 years, and he appears. They talk briefly. Man-wol says she has finally freed herself and there is no more need for him to stay. The hairpin turns to ash and Chung-myung becomes a firefly again. Magu tells Man-wol that she needs to send Chung-myung off to the afterlife; that will be her last punishment. Hyun-joong finally tells Yoo-na that he will be leaving soon, once his sister dies. Man-wol takes the limo to the afterlife with Chung-myung to see him off. She asks Chan-sung to wait for her. A month later, life at the hotel continues normally, but Man-wol has not returned and the tree is dead once again. Hyun-joong speculates that this means she won't be coming back. The staff tells the Grim Reaper that they want Man-wol back. They're sure she won't leave Chan-sung behind. The Grim Reaper tells them that if she has set foot on the bridge to the afterlife, she might not remember him any more. We see Man-wol and Chung-myung slowly walking across the bridge together. She stops, he reaches out his hand to her, but she turns around and heads back.
15	15	August 31, 2019
Magu's pharmacist sister brews the wine that will be given to the next owner of the hotel. One key ingredient is missing. Magu sends Chan-sung 200 years into the past to retrieve it, warning him not to eat or drink anything there or he won't be able to return. Knowing that he might be able to see Man-wol again, and missing her badly, he agrees to go. Chan-sung goes to Joseon and visits "Man-wol Inn" where he meets Man-wol and the staff. Man-wol has a gambling addiction. As punishment, the Magu who brings poverty visits every day and now Man-wol is nearly broke. The staff hopes that Chan-sung has come to be the new human steward. Chan-sung challenges Magu to a game of baduk; if he wins, Magu will leave. Chan-sung wins, Magu leaves, and Chan-sung makes Man-wol sign a pledge to never gamble again. She invites him to stay on as steward. He seriously considers it as it will mean staying by her side, but in the end tells her he must go back to wait for someone he loves. He returns and is greeted with the news that Man-wol has come back. In a flashback, Hyun-joong is killed during the war by his best friend Tae-seok. In remorse, Tae-seok takes on the responsibility of caring for Hyun-joong's sister and takes Hyun-joong's identity. Tae-seok becomes a respected doctor and does many good deeds in Hyun-joong's name. The ghost of an author comes to the hotel. From him, Mr. Kim learns of a book about to be published about a Joseon scholar who was disgraced for writing lewd literature. Mr. Kim realizes that the book is about him. Yoo-na steals the wine from Magu's pharmacy and asks Man-wol to drink it so she will remain the owner of the hotel and stay. After discussing it with Chan-sung, Man-wol decides not to drink it. She and Chan-sung confess their love for each other.
16	16	September 1, 2019
In a flashback, we see Man-wol as a small child, lost and on the verge of death in the woods. The Grim Reaper appears, and then Magu, who convinces him to give the child a bit more time. A passing merchant and his small son pass by. The son spots Man-wol and convinces his father to rescue her. The boy is Chan-sung in a previous life. Mr. Kim nearly leaves for the afterlife due to his humiliation. Magu tells Man-wol that the Guest House of the Moon will shut down at the next full moon. Man-wol and Chan-sung prevent the book from being published and asks Mr. Kim to explain what really happened. Mr. Kim relates the story of his life in a small village. When not studying, he watched the lives of the local villagers. To pass the time, he wrote stories based on what he saw on the streets. Man-wol and Chan-sung are shocked to recognize the stories as some of the greatest literature in Korean history; their unknown author is compared to Shakespeare. They are amazed to learn that Mr. Kim was the author. Unfortunately, writing stories about commoners was considered vulgar in his time and he died in disgrace. Man-wol and Chan-sung convince the author to rewrite the book to portray Mr. Kim as the author of the famous stories. With the new book published, Mr. Kim announces that he's ready to go on to the afterlife and says his goodbyes. After he leaves, Man-wol's reserve breaks and she sobs at her desk. Ms. Choi meets Su-jin. Su-jin tells Ms. Choi that she intends to give the baby her own surname. Ms. Choi comes to let go of her grudge and wishes Su-jin's baby a happy life. Hyun-joong's sister dies. Hyun-joong brings her to the hotel and then they leave for the afterlife together. He has a last tearful goodbye with Yoo-na. With the last guest gone, Ms. Choi also leaves for the afterlife. Chan-sung asks Magu why she chose him. She responds that there is one last dream waiting for him. Man-wol walks around the empty hotel one last time. She and Chan-sung spend their last evening together. They agree to meet again in their next lives no matter what. She leaves for the afterlife alone. Chan-sung watches her leave in tears. Piece by piece, the hotel fades from existence. By winter, Chan-sung meets Yoo-na to catch up. She thanks him for the medicine he gave her so she no longer sees ghosts. She asks if he took the medicine too, but he doesn't answer. In another life, Mr. Kim, Ms. Choe and Hyun-joong cross paths in a park, unaware that they knew each other in the past, and Gu Chan-sung and Jang Man-wol are a happy couple. In the epilogue: Magu announces the arrival of a new hotel owner to her "sisters", but cannot recall the hotel's name. The hotel is renamed Hotel Blue Moon, and the new owner is a handsome young man. He tells the staff to open the hotel doors.

== Original soundtrack ==
Hotel del Luna OST

Soundtrack album by Various artists
- Recorded: 2019
- Genre: Soundtrack
- Languages: Korean; English
- Labels: Dreamus; YAMYAM Entertainment

Original Soundtrack (Parts 1–13 + Special soundtrack)

Part 1

Released on July 14, 2019
No.	Title	Lyrics	Music	Artist	Length
1.	"Another Day"	Ji Hoon; Park Se-jun	Noheul; A10tion	Monday Kiz; Punch	3:38
2.	"Another Day" (Inst.)		Noheul; A10tion		3:38
Total length:					7:16

Part 2

Released on July 20, 2019
No.	Title	Lyrics	Music	Artist	Length
1.	"Lean On My Shoulders" (나의 어깨에 기대어요)	Ji Hoon; Park Se-jun	Lee Seung-joo; Choi In-hwan	10cm	3:31
2.	"Lean On My Shoulders" (Inst.)		Lee Seung-joo; Choi In-hwan		3:31
Total length:					7:02

Part 3

Released on July 21, 2019
No.	Title	Lyrics	Music	Artist	Length
1.	"All About You" (그대라는 시)	Ji Hoon; Park Se-jun	minGtion	Taeyeon	3:30
2.	"All About You" (Inst.)		minGtion		3:30
Total length:					7:00

Part 4

Released on July 27, 2019
No.	Title	Lyrics	Music	Artist	Length
1.	"Only You" (너만 너만 너만)	Ji Hoon; Park Se-jun; Yoda	Kim Se-jin; Midnight	Yang Da-il	4:15
2.	"Only You" (Inst.)		Kim Se-jin; Midnight		4:15
Total length:					8:30

Part 5

Released on July 28, 2019
No.	Title	Lyrics	Music	Artist	Length
1.	"Can You See My Heart" (내 맘을 볼수 있나요)	Ji Hoon; Park Se-jun; Yoda	Choi In-hwan; Lee Seung-joo	Heize	3:46
2.	"Can You See My Heart" (Inst.)		Choi In-hwan; Lee Seung-joo		3:46
Total length:					7:32

Part 6

Released on August 3, 2019
No.	Title	Lyrics	Music	Artist	Length
1.	"At The End Of You" (그 끝에 그대)	Ji Hoon; Park Se-jun	Noheul; A10tion	Chungha	3:45
2.	"At The End Of You" (Inst.)		Noheul; A10tion		3:45
Total length:					7:30

Part 7

Released on August 4, 2019
No.	Title	Lyrics	Music	Artist	Length
1.	"Remember All My Days And Then" (기억해줘요 내 모든 날과 그때를)	Ji Hoon; Park Se-jun	Kangaroo; Rocoberry	Gummy	3:49
2.	"Remember All My Days And Then" (Inst.)		Kangaroo; Rocoberry		3:49
Total length:					7:38

Part 8

Released on August 10, 2019
No.	Title	Lyrics	Music	Artist	Length
1.	"See the Stars" (어떤 별보다)	Ji Hoon; Park Se-jun	Yoo Song-yeon; Jay Lee	Red Velvet	3:51
2.	"See the Stars" (Inst.)		Yoo Song-yeon; Jay Lee		3:51
Total length:					7:42

Part 9

Released on August 11, 2019
No.	Title	Lyrics	Music	Artist	Length
1.	"Can You Hear My Voice" (내 목소리 들리니)	Ji Hoon; Park Se-jun	Rocoberry	Ben	4:32
2.	"Can You Hear My Voice" (Inst.)		Rocoberry		4:32
Total length:					9:04

Part 10

Released on August 12, 2019
No.	Title	Lyrics	Music	Artist	Length
1.	"So Long" (안녕)	Paul Kim; Ji Hoon; Park Se-jun	Rocoberry; Paul Kim	Paul Kim	3:46
2.	"So Long" (Inst.)		Rocoberry; Paul Kim		3:46
Total length:					7:32

Part 11

Released on August 17, 2019
No.	Title	Lyrics	Music	Artist	Length
1.	"Say Goodbye"	Ji Hoon; Park Se-jun	Ahn Young-min; Lee Seung-joo	Song Ha-ye	3:05
2.	"Say Goodbye" (Inst.)		Ahn Young-min; Lee Seung-joo		3:05
Total length:					6:10

Part 12

Released on August 18, 2019
No.	Title	Lyrics	Music	Artist	Length
1.	"Done For Me"	Ji Hoon	Lee Seung-joo	Punch	3:52
2.	"Done For Me" (Inst.)		Lee Seung-joo		3:52
Total length:					7:44

Part 13

Released on August 24, 2019
No.	Title	Lyrics	Music	Artist	Length
1.	"Love del Luna" (러브 델루나)	Ji Hoon, Park Se-jun, Peter Pan	A10TION	Taeyong, Punch	4:28
2.	"Love del Luna" (Inst.)		A10TION		4:28
Total length:					8:56

Special soundtrack

Released on (N/A)
No.	Title	Lyrics	Music	Artist	Length
1.	"Happy Ending"	Lee Ji-eun (IU)	Kim Je-hwi	Lee Ji-eun (IU)	2:36
Total length:					2:36

=== Chart performance ===
Title	Year	Peak positions	Remarks	Ref.
Title	Year	KOR	Remarks	Ref.
"Another Day" (Monday Kiz and Punch)	2019	20	Part 1	
"Lean On My Shoulders" (나의 어깨에 기대어요) (10cm)	2019	13	Part 2	
"All About You" (그대라는 시) (Taeyeon)	2019	1	Part 3	
"Only You" (너만 너만 너만) (Yang Da-il)	2019	33	Part 4	
"Can You See My Heart" (내 맘을 볼 수 있나요) (Heize)	2019	2	Part 5	
"At the End" (그 끝에 그대) (Chungha)	2019	18	Part 6	
"Remember Me" (기억해줘요 내 모든 날과 그때를) (Gummy)	2019	1	Part 7	
"See the Stars" (어떤 별보다) (Red Velvet)	2019	50	Part 8	
"Can You Hear Me" (내 목소리 들리니) (Ben)	2019	3	Part 9	
"So Long" (안녕) (Paul Kim)	2019	1	Part 10	
"Say Goodbye" (Song Ha-ye)	2019	22	Part 11	
"Done for Me" (돈포미) (Punch)	2019	1	Part 12	
"Love del Luna" (러브 델루나) (Taeyong & Punch)	2019	46	Part 13	
"—" denotes releases that did not chart or were not released in that region.

== Viewership ==
The series aired on tvN, a cable channel/pay TV which normally has a relatively smaller audience compared to free-to-air TV/public broadcasters (KBS, SBS, MBC and EBS).

Hotel del Luna : South Korea viewers per episode (millions)

Season	Episode number																Average
Season	1	2	3	4	5	6	7	8	9	10	11	12	13	14	15	16	Average
1	2.037	2.258	2.349	2.288	2.063	2.664	2.372	2.926	2.679	3.034	2.645	3.340	2.519	3.101	3.014	3.674	2.685

Source: Audience measurement performed nationwide by Nielsen Media Research.

Average TV viewership ratings
Ep.	Original broadcast date	Average audience share (Nielsen Korea)	
Ep.	Original broadcast date	Nationwide	Seoul
1	July 13, 2019	7.327% (1st)	7.749% (1st)
2	July 14, 2019	7.633% (1st)	8.857% (1st)
3	July 20, 2019	8.281% (1st)	9.478% (1st)
4	July 21, 2019	7.736% (1st)	9.024% (1st)
5	July 27, 2019	7.023% (1st)	7.883% (1st)
6	July 28, 2019	8.701% (1st)	9.949% (1st)
7	August 3, 2019	8.052% (1st)	8.772% (1st)
8	August 4, 2019	9.131% (1st)	10.469% (1st)
9	August 10, 2019	8.349% (1st)	10.266% (1st)
10	August 11, 2019	10.009% (1st)	11.779% (1st)
11	August 17, 2019	8.590% (1st)	9.746% (1st)
12	August 18, 2019	10.407% (1st)	12.178% (1st)
13	August 24, 2019	8.750% (1st)	9.892% (1st)
14	August 25, 2019	9.995% (1st)	11.986% (1st)
15	August 31, 2019	9.892% (1st)	11.255% (1st)
16	September 1, 2019	12.001% (1st)	13.875% (1st)
Average		8.867%	10.197%
In the table above, the blue numbers represent the lowest ratings and the red numbers represent the highest ratings.

== Awards and nominations ==
Year	Award	Category	Recipient	Result	Ref.
2019	12th Korea Drama Awards	Best Original Soundtrack	"All About You" (Taeyeon)	Nominated	
2019	12th Korea Drama Awards	Lifetime Achievement Award	Jung Dong-hwan	Won	
2019	21st Mnet Asian Music Awards	Best OST	"Remember Me" (Gummy)	Won	
2019	21st Mnet Asian Music Awards	Best OST	"So Long" (Paul Kim)	Nominated	
2019	2nd Asian Academy Creative Awards	Best Drama Series	Hotel del Luna	Nominated	
2019	11th Melon Music Awards	Best OST	"Remember Me" (Gummy)	Won	
2020	34th Golden Disc Awards	Best OST	"Remember Me" (Gummy)	Won	
2020	29th Seoul Music Awards	OST Award	"All About You" (Taeyeon)	Won	
2020	29th Seoul Music Awards	OST Award	"Lean on Me" (10cm)	Nominated	
2020	29th Seoul Music Awards	OST Award	"Can You See My Heart?" (Heize)	Nominated	
2020	29th Seoul Music Awards	OST Award	"Remember Me" (Gummy)	Nominated	
2020	29th Seoul Music Awards	OST Award	"So Long" (Paul Kim)	Nominated	
2020	56th Baeksang Arts Awards	Best Actress (Television)	Lee Ji-eun	Nominated	

== Adaptations ==
On June 24, 2020, Studio Dragon announced that it would co-produce an American remake of Hotel del Luna with Skydance. Alison Schapker will be in charge of developing and producing the series. She will be working with Miky Lee, Jinnie Choi and Hyun Park of Studio Dragon, and David Ellison, Dana Goldberg and Bill Bost of Skydance Television.

On January 27, 2021, the theater company Showplay announced that Hotel del Luna would be adapted into a stage musical that premiered in South Korea in 2022.
