= Koma Shrine =

Shinto Shrine

Koma Shrine 高麗神社
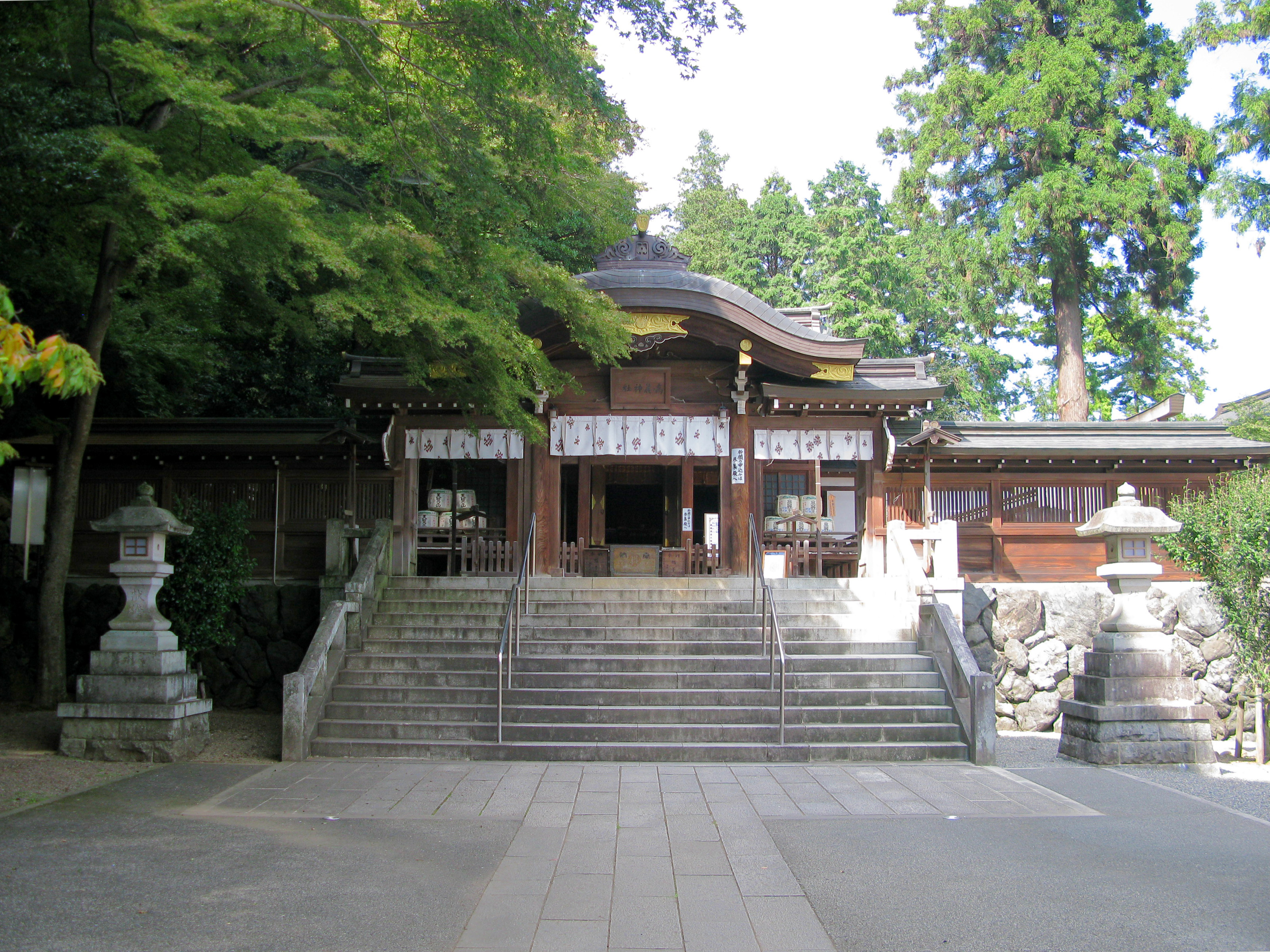
- Shinmon of Koma Shrine

- Koma Jinja Koma Shrine (Japan)

Religion
- Affiliation: Shinto
- Deity: Koma no ko ni kishijakkō
- Festival: October 19

Location
- Location: Hidaka-shi, Saitama-ken
- Coordinates: 35°53′54.9″N 139°19′22.1″E

Architecture
- Established: 716 AD

Website
- komajinja.or.jp

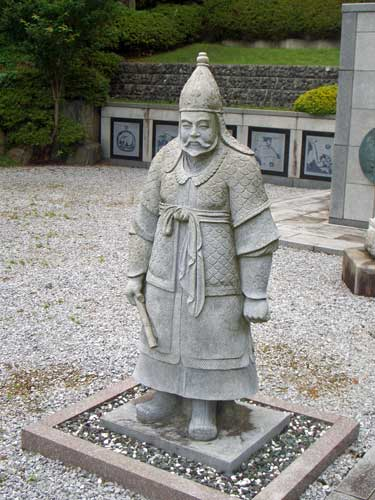
Statue of Jakkō at the shrine

Koma Shrine (高麗神社, Koma Jinja) is a Shinto shrine located in the city of Hidaka, Saitama. The word "Koma", pronounced in Korean as "Koryō (Goryeo)" is the ancient Japanese name for Korea, specifically the ancient Korean kingdom of Goguryeo, and the main temple kami of this shrine is the deified Prince Ko Yak'gwang (高若光), son of the last king of independent Goguryeo. The shrine was built by immigrants (Toraijins) of Goguryeo after its fall in 668.

== History ==
Goguryeo, was a Korean kingdom located in the northern and central parts of the Korean Peninsula and the southern and central parts of Manchuria. At its peak of power, Goguryeo controlled most of the Korean peninsula, large parts of Manchuria and parts of eastern Inner Mongolia.

Along with Baekje and Silla, Goguryeo was one of the Three Kingdoms of Korea. In the late 6th and early 7th centuries, Goguryeo was often in military conflict with the Sui and Tang dynasties of China. Its relations with Baekje and Silla were complex and alternated between alliances and enmity. In the summer of 666, de facto ruler Yŏn Kaesomun died and Goguryeo was thrown into chaos and weakened by a succession struggle among his sons and younger brother. Tang Emperor Gaozong saw this as an opportunity and invaded, conquering the kingdom with the help of Silla by 668 AD. However, there was much resistance to Tang rule. Prince Ko Yak'gwang (高若光), son of the last king of Goguryeo, Bojang, sent to Japan in 666 AD to seek military assistance from the Asuka period Emperor Tenji. After the fall of the kingdom, he remained in exile in Japan. In 716 AD he was granted Koma County in Musashi Province, and settled in this location with 1799 Goguryeo refugees, mostly from Suruga Province. This territory included all of present-day Hidaka and Tsurugashima, as well as parts of Hannō, Kawagoe, Iruma and Sayama. The area continued to be ruled by the Koma clan until the end of the Kamakura period.

The shrine is believed to have been founded around this time. It received a stipend of three koku for its upkeep under the Tokugawa shogunate. After the Meiji restoration and the establishment of State Shinto, the shrine was ranked as a prefectural shrine (県社).

Following the annexation of Korea by Japan in 1905, the Koma Shrine was used as a symbol by Japanese government officials, including Governor-General of Korea Jirō Minami, for the assimilation and unification of the Korean and Japanese people. In 1934 the Koma Jinja Hosan-kai was founded in order to preserve and restore the shrine, headed by then-Minister of Colonial Affairs Hideo Kodama.

Koma Shrine maintained cultural relevance after World War II, and it was written about by prominent Japanese authors such as Eiji Yoshikawa and Ango Sakaguchi.

The shrine has more recently been fashioned as a symbol of Japanese-Korean friendship, and is endorsed by the South Korean Ministry of Foreign Affairs.

In 2017, Emperor Akihito visited the shrine as an official visit with his son Naruhito having visited the shrine during his high school years, and expressed friendship with South Korea.

== Tourism ==
Approximately 300,000 tourists visit the shrine annually. The shrine is located about 20 minutes on foot from JR East Komagawa Station.

== Religious function ==
The shrine deifies a Prince Ko Yak'gwang (高若光) of the Koma clan (later known as Genbu Jakkō (玄武若光)). Yakgwang reportedly introduced the cultivation of silkworms and mulberry, leading to his deification as Koma Myojin following his death.

Its hereditary kannushi are believed to be his descendants. The shrine is currently presided over by Koma Fumiyasu, whom according to the Koma-shi keizu genealogical scroll is a sixty-second generation direct descendant of Jakkō.

== Koma clan residence ==
The Koma clan residence (高麗家住宅, Koma-ke jyutaku) located adjacent to the shrine precincts was built in the Keichō era (1596-1615). It is a thatch roofed irimoya-gabled building and was designated as a National Important Cultural Property in 1976.
