= Gyerim Territory Area Command =

Colony of Tang China under the Jimi system

Chinese name
- Traditional Chinese: 雞林州都督府
- Simplified Chinese: 鸡林州都督府
Transcriptions
Standard Mandarin
- Hanyu Pinyin: Jī lín zhōu dūdū fǔ
- Wade–Giles: chi^{1} lin^{2} chou^{1} tu^{1} tu^{1} fu^{3}

Korean name
- Hangul: 계림주도독부
- Hanja: 鷄林州都督府
Transcriptions
- Revised Romanization: Gyerim Dae Dodokbu
- McCune–Reischauer: Kyerim Tae Totokpu

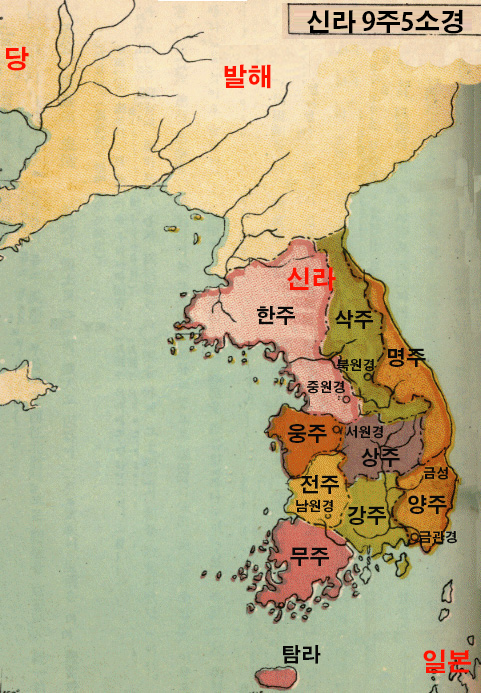
Map of Silla (in Korean)

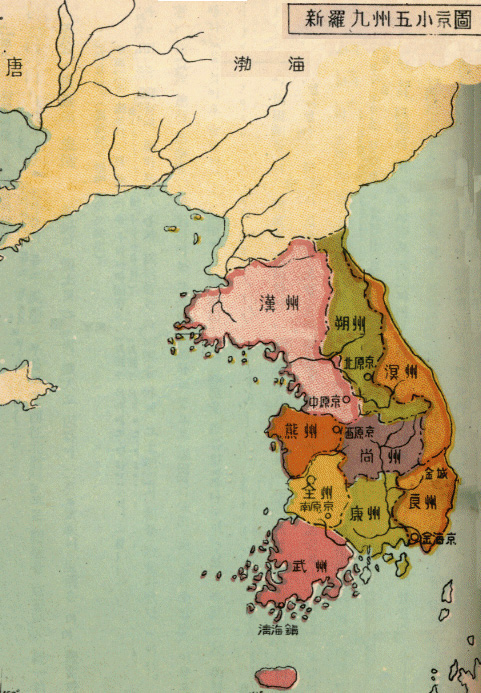
Map of Silla (in Chinese)

The Gyerim Territory Area Command was a proposed autonomous administration to be established in Silla territory by the Tang dynasty. In the place of Baekje and Goguryeo, the Tang created the Protectorate General to Pacify the East, Ungjin Commandery.

== History ==
In 660, when a joint Silla-Tang alliance destroyed Baekje, the Tang dynasty established a protectorate named the Ungjin Commandery in its stead. Furthermore, the Tang emperor offered to Munmu of Silla that he take over a proposed protectorate called the "Great Commandery of Gyerim", which was refused.

Following the offer Silla launched a surprise attack against the Tang forces and destroyed the Ungjin commandery. Over the course of several battles Tang forces would be driven north of the Taedong river by the Silla army.

In the south of Silla another administrative subdivision named Jimizhou was to be set up. Munmu of Silla was to be nominated as first "commander." After that the position was to be inherited by the line of rulers of Silla.

In the 8th century, An Lushan Rebellion began, Ping Lu Fanzhen (Hanja:平盧藩鎮) was moved to Shandong Peninsula and renamed as Zi Qing Ping Lu Fanzhen (Hanja:淄青平盧藩鎮), Fanzhen attempted to hold a post of Commander of Gyerim Protectorate and crossed the sea for it.

== See also ==
- Protectorate General to Pacify the East
- Ungjin Commandery
