= See the Stars =

Song by Red Velvet

from the album Hotel Del Luna (Original Television Soundtrack)
- Language: Korean
- Released: August 10, 2019
- Studio: SM Studios, Seoul, South Korea
- Genre: R&B
- Length: 7:34
- Label: YAMYAM Entertainment
- Songwriter(s): Ji-hoon; Park Se-jun
- Producer(s): Yoo Song-yeon; Jay Lee

Audio video
- "See the Stars" on YouTube

"See the Stars" (Korean: 어떤 별보다; RR: Eotteon byeolboda) is a song recorded by South Korean girl group Red Velvet for the soundtrack of the 2019 drama series Hotel del Luna. It was released as a digital single on August 10, 2019, by YAMYAM Entertainment, under license by Dreamus.

== Background and composition ==
Musically, "See the Stars" was described as a "medium R&B song with a sweet piano melody and a sophisticated arrangement". The song is composed in the key of D major with a tempo of 90 beat-per-minute. The song was produced by Yoo Song-yeon and Jay Lee.

== Credits and personnel ==
Credits adapted from Melon.

- Red Velvet (Irene, Seulgi, Wendy, Joy, Yeri) – vocals
- Song Dong-woon – production
- Ji-hoon – songwriting
- Park Se-jun – songwriting
- Yoo Song-yeon – production, arrangement, piano, organ
- Jay Lee (SM LVYIN Studio) – production, arrangement, bass, drum, recording engineer
- Lee Byung-woo – guitar
- Kim Hyun-gon (doobdoob Studio) – mixing engineer
- Choi Hyo-young (SOUNO) – mastering

== Track listing ==
Digital download / streaming
No.	Title	Lyrics	Music	Arrangement	Length
1.	"See the Stars"	Ji-hoon; Park Se-jun	Yoo Song-yeon; Jay Lee	Jay Lee; Yoo Song-yeon	3:51
2.	"See the Stars (Instrumental)"		Yoo Song-yeon; Jay Lee	Jay Lee; Yoo Song-yeon	3:51
Total length:					7:42

== Charts ==
=== Weekly charts ===
Weekly chart performance for "See the Stars"
Chart (2019)	Peak position
South Korea (Gaon)	50
South Korea (Kpop Hot 100)	50

== Release history ==
Release dates and formats for "See the Stars"
Region	Date	Format	Label	Ref.
South Korea	August 10, 2019	Digital download; streaming	YAMYAM Entertainment	
Various	August 10, 2019	Digital download; streaming	YAMYAM Entertainment	
