= Geom Mojam =

Goguryeo commander

- Hangul: 검모잠
- Hanja: 劍牟岑
- RR: Geom Mojam
- MR: Kŏm Mojam

Geom Mojam (?–670) was the military leader of a short-lived movement to restore Goguryeo after its fall to Silla in the later 7th century CE. After the kingdom fell to Tang and Silla in 668, he kindled an opposition movement in the Taedong River valley and in 670 established Anseung (안승, 安勝, another source has it as Ansun, 안순, 安舜) as the new King of Goguryeo. Anseung is believed to have been the illegitimate son of King Bojang, the last ruler of that kingdom. The capital was set up in modern-day Chaeryŏng-gun, South Hwanghae, North Korea. The rebellion is briefly described in the Samguk Sagi, Goguryeo Book 10.

One source gives Geom's birthplace as Surimseong (수림성, 水臨城), while the Samguk Sagi (“Annals of Silla”/King Munmu 10/Month 6) relates that he was a native of the walled city of Yeongnim (location unknown). His date of birth is unknown. As military official, the Samguk Sagi relates, he reached the rank of daehyeong (대형, 大兄), seventh among the 14 ranks of Goguryeo officialdom. However, the New History of Tang (book 220/“Gaoli Monograph”) records his name as Gyeom Mojam (겸모잠, 鉗牟岑) and his office as that of daejang.

The Samguk Sagi relates how following the fall of Goguryeo Geom departed from Gungmo fortress (궁모성, 窮牟城) and arriving to the south of the Pae River he met and killed several Tang officials and the monk Fa An (法安) before heading for Silla territory. En route to Silla he met Anseung at Saya Island (present day Soya Island) and together they came to Han fortress (present day Chaeryŏng, Chaeryŏng county, South Hwanghae Province). There Anseung was proclaimed king of Goguryeo.

After placing Anseung on the throne, Geom dispatched the sohyeong (소형, 小兄) Dasik (다식, 多式) to Silla to request armed assistance and recognition from that kingdom. Silla at this time was struggling to avoid absorption into the Tang dynasty through the Protectorate General to Pacify the East (安東都護府), a military government Tang had established on the peninsula after the fall of Baekje and Goguryeo. Therefore, Silla eagerly sent an embassy recognizing Ansun as the legitimate King of Goguryeo and offering an alliance. But relation with Geom and Anseung suddenly deteriorated, and Geom was assassinated at the behest of Anseung. After the assassination, Anseung fled to Silla and later ruled the short-lived Bodeok Kingdom based in Iksan.

Geom's struggle is comparable to that of the Baekje leader Boksin, who led a similarly ill-fated attempt to restore the Baekje state a decade before. The ultimate failure of Geom's struggle also prepared the way for the subsequent Goguryeo diaspora.

== In popular culture ==
- Portrayed by Kim Myung-soo in the 2006-2007 KBS TV series Dae Jo-yeong.

== See also ==
- History of Korea
- Three Kingdoms of Korea
- Anseung
