= Ungjin Commandery =

7th-century Chinese commandery

Chinese name
- Chinese: 熊津都督府
Transcriptions
Standard Mandarin
- Hanyu Pinyin: Xióng jīn dūdū fǔ
- Wade–Giles: hsiung^{2} chin^{1} tu^{1} tu^{1} fu^{3}

Korean name
- Hangul: 웅진도독부
- Hanja: 熊津都督府
Transcriptions
- Revised Romanization: Ungjin Dodokbu
- McCune–Reischauer: Ungjin Todokpu

The Ungjin Commandery was an administrative division of the Chinese Tang dynasty that existed between 660 and 671 on the Korean Peninsula. It was created in place of Baekje in present-day Chungcheong Province after its defeat by a joint Silla-Tang alliance, but was destroyed only a few years after due to a counterattack by Silla and remnant Baekje forces. The Tang dynasty moved the now nonexistent Ungjin Commandery into the Protectorate General to Pacify the East. Those political organizations renamed the newly conquered areas under the Jimi system.

== History ==
In the year of 660, Ungjin Commandery is a administrative subdivision set up for the purpose of governing the old Baekje area which is current Chungcheong Province. At that time, Ungjin (Administrative center・Sabi castle also known as Goma castle, which is currently called Chungcheong Province, Buyeo County), Mahan confederacy (Gosaburi castle, North Jeolla Province, Jeongeup), Dongmyeong Province, Ungjin castle, Chungcheong Province, Gonju city), Deongan Province, Deugan castle, Chungcheong Province, Nonsan city, Eunjin area, Gimnan Province castle, Chungcheong Province, Seosan city) and Daemang (대망; 帶方) Province (Jukgun castle, South Jeolla Province, Naju city, Hoejin).

Ungjin Commandery governed following 13 prefectures under jurisdiction. Ui (우이; 嵎夷), Singu(신구; 神丘), Rindeok (린덕; 麟徳), Yunseong (윤성; 尹城), Sangon (산곤; 散昆), Anwon (안원; 安遠), Binmun (빈문; 賓汶), Gwiwa (귀와; 帰化) or known as Masaryang (마사량; 麻斯良), Maena (매나; 邁羅), Gamgae (감개; 甘蓋) or known as Gomagburi (고막부리; 古莫夫里), Naseo (나서; 奈西), Deongan (덕안; 徳安), Nongsan (농산; 龍山). Angdong Territory Area Command governed 4 prefectures which were Naejin (내진; 熊津), Nosin (노신; 鹵辛) or known as Anogog (아노곡; 阿老谷), Guji (구지; 久遅) or known as Guji (구지; 仇知) and Burim (부림; 富林) or known as Beoreum (벌음; 伐音). Gimnan Province governed Pyeoni (편이; 平夷) prefecture also known as Juryu (주류; 周留) or Jiryu (지류; 知留), Mahan Territory Area Command governed Pyoeonwa (편와; 平倭), Biri (비리; 比利), Mijung (미중; 辟中), Bomi (보미; 布弥), Jiban (지반; 支半). Daemang Province governed Jiryu (지류; 至留) also known as Jiryu, Gunna (군나; 軍那) or known as Gurna (굴나; 屈那), Dosan (도산; 徒山) or known as Chusan (추산; 抽山), Banna (반나; 半那) or known as Bannaburi (반나부리; 半那夫里), Jukgu or known as Duhil (두힐; 豆肸) and Bohyeon (보현; 布賢) or known as Panomi (파노미; 巴老弥).

As Wang Wendu, the general of Tang dynasty has died, the momentum of Baekje revival movements has raised. Gwisil Boksin who was the retainer of Mu of Baekje made use of political turmoil of Wang Wendu, called Buyeo Pung back from Japan and based at Juryu castle. They attacked Tang dynasty together with Japanese army. In 661, Tang dynasty nominated Liu Renyuan as the commander of Ungjin Commandery and Daemang Province. In 663, Baekje and Japanese army has defeated in the Battle of Baekgang and they failed in retrieving Baekje.

After the Battle of Baekgang, Liu Renyuan returned to Tang dynasty and Liu Renzhi was sent to govern the Barkeje area. Liu Renzhi tried to reconstruct battlefields. In 665, he promoted merger of territorial area commands, states and prefecture. As a result, 6 territorial area command have integrated and transformed into 7 states (Dongmyeong, Jisim, Nosan, Gosa, Saban Daemang, and Buncha) and 13 prefectures under Ungjin (웅진; 熊津). The central government have set at Sabi castle (Chungcheong Province, Buyeo County). Buyeo Yung (부여륭; 扶余隆) who was a former prince of Barkje was nominated a commander of Ungjin Territory Area. He was given this position to command and to manage battlefield of Baekje and its survivors, however, he was afraid of Silla's invasion and did not take his position. For his replacement, Liu Rengui took over the position. After Goguryeo was overthrown, Liu Rengui and Liu Rengui returned to Tang dynasty. Buyeo Yung refused to take position of commander, his position was deputized by Nagan (나간; 難汗) and Yegun (예군; 禰軍).

After that, Silla rebelled and attached Ungjin Commandery in July, 670. 82 castle have been surrendered. Even after the invasion of Silla never stop and majority of former Baekje's land have occupied and they reached to Ungjin and Sabi where Tang dynasty set central government to manage former Baekje's land. Tang dynasty nominated Xue Rengui as a commander of Gyerim Territory Area Command and fought against Silla, but in the end, they are failed and Ungjin Commandery was occupied by Silla.

After the disturbance, Tang dynasty transferred Ungjin Territory Area Command to Geonan (건안; 建安) castle (present-day Yingkou, Liaoning). It has merged with Anju (안주; 安州) Territorial Area Command which governed by Protectorate General to Pacify the East.

In 686, Silla established Ungjin Territorial Area Command and renamed it as Ungcheon (웅천; 熊川) in 757. In 940, Ungcheon was renamed as Gongju and Territorial Area Command was set, and in 983, it was promoted as Gongju province.

== See also ==
- Protectorate General to Pacify the East
- Gyerim Territory Area Command
