= Chaeryong County =

Chaeryŏng County 재령군
- County

Korean transcription(s)
  - Hanja: 載寧郡
  - McCune-Reischauer: Chaeryŏng-gun
  - Revised Romanization: Jaeryeong-gun
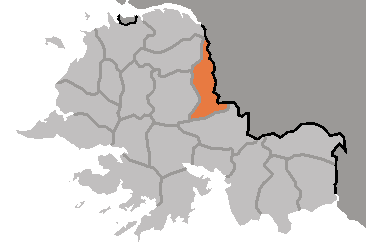
- Country: North Korea
- Province: South Hwanghae Province
- Administrative divisions: 1 ŭp, 1 rodongjagu, 24 ri

Area
  - Total: 327.7 km^{2} (126.5 sq mi)

Population (2008)
  - Total: 125,631
  - Density: 383.4/km^{2} (992.9/sq mi)

Chaeryŏng County is a county in South Hwanghae province, North Korea.

== Geography ==
Located on the Chaeryŏng River, the county is bordered to the west by Anak and Sinch'ŏn, to the south by Sinwŏn, and to the east by Ŭnp'a, Pongsan and Sariwŏn in North Hwanghae Province.

== History ==
Chaeryŏng County was first founded by the kingdom of Koguryo, who called it Siksŏng (息城郡), and later Hanseong (KR: 한성, Hanja: 漢城). Hanseong was named one of the three capitals of Goguryeo, along with Pyongyang and Gungnae. After the fall of Goguryeo in 668, it became the southern center of the Goguryeo restoration movements led by Goguryeo commander Geom Mojam. The Koryo dynasty, the successor state to Goguryeo, gave it its current name in 1217. In 1415, it was promoted to county level under the Yi. Chaeryŏng was briefly merged into the newly formed Hwanghae District in 1895 during an experimental redistricting, but was restored to its previous form in 1896. During Japanese rule, which lasted from 1910 to 1945, the county was called Sainei (載寧). The county's current form was settled in the 1952 redistricting changes.

== Transportation ==
Chaeryŏng county is served by the Ŭllyul Line of the Korean State Railway. There is also a highway which runs through Chaeryŏng-ŭp.

== Administrative divisions ==
The county is divided into one town (ŭp), one worker's district (rodongjagu) and 24 villages (ri).

	Chosŏn'gŭl	Hancha
Chaeryŏng-ŭp	재령읍	載寧邑
Kŭmsal-lodongjagu	금산노동자구	金山勞動者區
Chaech'ŏl-l	재천리	財泉里
Changgung-ri	장국리	墻菊里
Ch'ŏngch'ŏl-li	청천리	清川里
Ch'ŏnma-ri	천마리	川磨里
Kanggyo-ri	강교리	江橋里
Kimjewŏl-li	김제원리	金濟元里
Kosal-li	고산리	孤山里
Kulhae-ri	굴해리	屈海里
Namji-ri	남지리	南芝里
Pongch'ŏl-li	봉천리	蓬泉里
Pong'o-ri	봉오리	鳳梧里
Pudŏng-ri	부덕리	富德里
Pukchi-ri	북지리	北芝里
Pyŏksal-li	벽산리	碧山里
Naerim-ri	래림리	來臨里
Ryonggyo-ri	룡교리	龍橋里
Samjigang-ri	삼지강리	三支江里
Sin'got-ri	신곶리	新串里
Sinhwanp'o-ri	신환포리	新換浦里
Sŏkt'al-li	석탄리	石灘里
Sŏrim-ri	서림리	西林里
Sŏwŏl-li	서원리	書院里
Tongsinhŭng-ri	동신흥리	東新興里
Yanggye-ri	양계리	陽溪里

== People born in Chaeryŏng ==
- Song Hae (1927–2022, born Song Bok-hui), South Korean singer and comedian, best known as host of Korea Sings (1980–present)
- Choi Eun-Taek (1938–2007), South Korean football coach

== See also ==
- Geography of North Korea
- Administrative divisions of North Korea
