= Protectorate General to Pacify the East =

Tang dynasty administrative division

- Protectorate General to Pacify the East within Tang territories

Chinese name
- Traditional Chinese: 安東都護府
- Simplified Chinese: 安东都护府
Transcriptions
Standard Mandarin
- Hanyu Pinyin: Āndōng Dūhùfǔ
- Wade–Giles: An^{1}-tung^{1} Tu^{1}-hu^{4}-fu^{3}

Korean name
- Hangul: 안동도호부
- Hanja: 安東都護府
Transcriptions
- Revised Romanization: Andong Dohobu
- McCune–Reischauer: Andong Tohobu

The Protectorate-General to Pacify the East (simplified Chinese: 安东都护府; traditional Chinese: 安東都護府; pinyin: Āndōng Dūhùfǔ) was an administrative division of the Chinese Tang dynasty in Manchuria and the northern part of the Korean Peninsula. It was established after the Tang dynasty defeated Goguryeo and annexed its territories. In the Baekje and Goguryeo domains, the Tang dynasty created the Protectorate General to Pacify the East and the Ungjin Commandery. A proposal to set up the Great Commandery of Gyerim by the Emperor Gaozong of Tang to King Munmu of Silla was refused.

== History ==
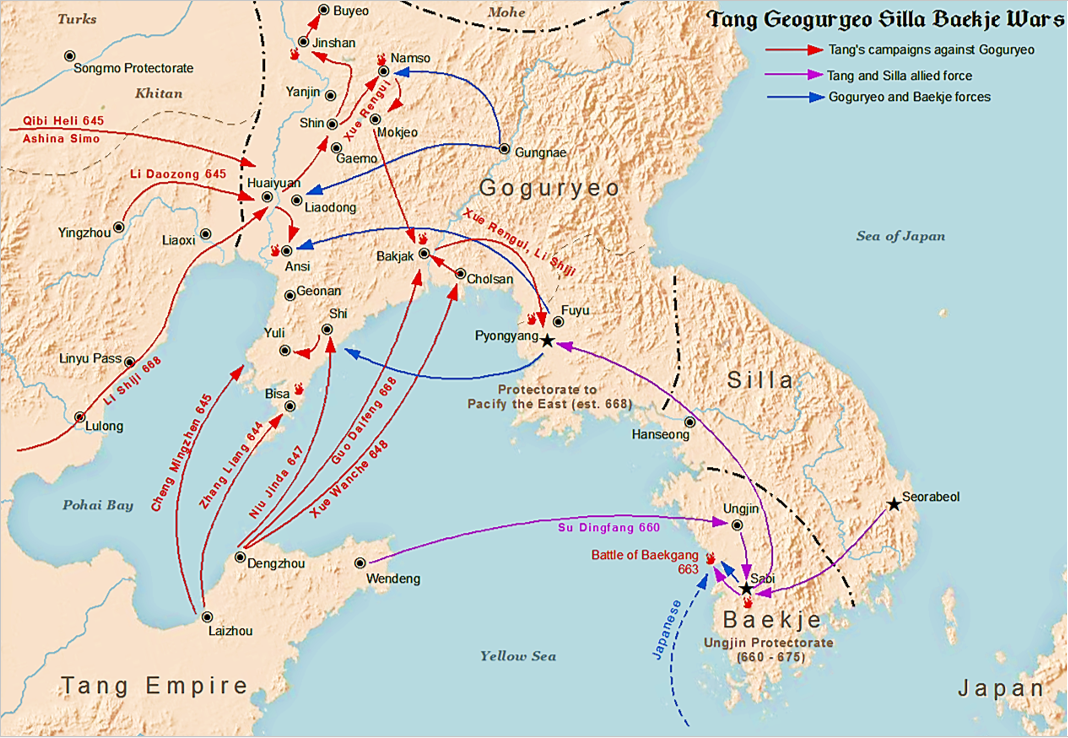
Goguryeo-Tang wars.

After the Tang dynasty conquered Goguryeo in 668, the Protectorate General to Pacify the East, otherwise known as the Andong Protectorate, was created in Pyongyang and supposedly stationed with 200,000 soldiers. The protectorate was divided into 9 commanderies, 42 prefectures, and 100 counties with an estimated 697,000 Goguryeo households.

In 669 the people of Goguryeo revolted in response to Tang governance. In response the Tang forcibly deported tens of thousands of households and resettled them in empty areas south of the Changjiang (Yangtze) and Huai River, each in contemporary China. The weak and poor were left behind and assigned to guard duty in service of the protectorate. Different numbers of households are given by various sources. According to the Samguk Sagi citing Chinese sources, the Zizhi Tongjian says 38,200 households, the Old Book of Tang and Tongdian say 28,200, and the New Book of Tang says 30,000. The Samguk Sagi says 38,300. Mark Cartwright gives a number of 200,000 people forcefully resettled including the king. Wang Zhenping gives a figure of 78,000 households.

From 670 to 675, Goguryeo loyalists aligned with Silla launched offensives against the Tang Chinese on all fronts within and outside the Protectorate. Aided by Silla, Goguryeo generals such as Go Yeonmu and Geom Mojam reclaimed parts of former Goguryeo territories after winning several decisive battles in Ogol, Gaedonyang, and Paeseo. For instance, Go Yeonmu, led a counter-offensive against the Tang armies in Liaodong alongside the Sillan general Seol Oyu in 670, defeating the Tang armies stationed in the area and occupying it briefly until 674. Originally Emperor Taizong of Tang promised to exchange Baekje and the lands south of Pyongyang in return for Silla's military cooperation. However Taizong died before the conquest of Goguryeo was completed, and his successor Gaozong reneged on the promise.

In 671, Sillan forces drove out the Tang. In 675 the Tang attacked Silla and defeated them in Gyeonggi. In response Munmu of Silla dispatched a tributary mission to Tang with apologies. Gaozong accepted Munmu's apologies and withdrew Tang troops to deal with the Tibetan threat in the west. Seeing the Tang's strategic weakness, Silla renewed the advance on Tang territory. Silla took all the territory south of the Taedong River in a series of battles in 676.

By 676 the Tang were forced to relocate the protectorate seat to the more easily defendable city of Liaoyang.

In 677 the seat was moved to Xincheng, in modern Fushun, Liaoning.

The deposed Bojang of Goguryeo was designated "Liaodong Commander King of Joseon" (Korean: 요동주도독 조선왕; Hanja: 遼東州都督朝鮮王). Upon arriving in Liaodong, he plotted with the Mohe people to revive Goguryeo. News of his intentions reached the Tang, and Bojang was banished to southwestern China in 681.

In 697 a rebellion by the Khitan Li Jinzhong in Hebei led to the court's recommendation for Andong to be abandoned and for the members of the former Goguryeo royal house to rule on behalf of the Tang.

In 698, Andong Protectorate was demoted to Andong Area Command.

In 699, Tang troops were withdrawn from Liaodong and Ko Tŏngmu was appointed to the Andong Area Command. However, the "Granted Vassal King of Goryeo-Joseon" is recorded to have attended a state ritual held by Emperor Xuanzong of Tang in 725. This person was likely Ko Tŏngmu and was an inner official, which Kim Jong-bok argues means that Ko Tŏngmu was actually stationed in Tang territory and not Liaodong. According to the Old Book of Tang, after 699, the dispersed Goguryeo people defected to the Turks and the Mohe people, putting an end to the Goguryeo royal line. The New Book of Tang and other sources state that Goguryeo flourished and provided musicians to the Tang court in 818.

In 705 the protectorate seat was moved to Youzhou west of present day Beijing and Andong's status as Protectorate was restored.

In 714, the seat was moved to Pingzhou, in modern Lulong County, Qinhuangdao, Hebei.

In 717, the Tang restored Ying Prefecture (modern Chaoyang, Liaoning).

In 720, the Andong Protector General Xue Tai led 500 troops to attack the Tang but was captured.

In 736, the Tang formally recognized Silla's control of Korea south of the Taedong River. In 743, the seat was moved to the Old City of Liaoxi, possibly Ying Prefecture in modern Chaoyang, Liaoning.

The Protectorate General to Pacify the East, otherwise known as the Andong Protectorate, was abandoned in 756 or ended in 761. Another source dates the abolishment of the Andong Protectorate to 758. According to the Old Book of Tang, by the end of the Andong Protectorate during the Tianbao period (742-756), none of the 14 prefectures had moats and the area contained only 5,718 households and a population of 18,156 people.

== Aftermath ==
According to Kim Jong-bok, despite the Tang abandonment of Liaodong, neither Silla or Parhae occupied the area. Silla did not advance beyond the Taedong River and in 827, Silla mobilized 10,000 people to build a defensive wall along the river due to attacks from Parhae. The Old Book of Tang mentions Parhae's territory bordering Silla to the south, the sea to the east, and the Khitan to the west, but not the Tang in the southwest. Kim Jong-bok notes that the Parhae capital (Shangjing Longquanfu) was located 800 km from the Goguryeo capital at Gungnae protected by the Hwando fortress, which was established prior to Goguryeo's western and southern conquest of Liaodong and Pyongyang. The Liaodong area was treated by the Parhae as a buffer zone, which can be seen by their passivity when the Khitans advanced into Liaodong twice in the early 10th century. By 915, Abaoji was able to fish on the Yalu River and the only response from Silla and Goryeo was to send emissaries, which Abaoji did not respond to. Only after 918, when the Khitans took Liaoyang and resettled its people did Parhae respond with an attack in 924. The reason for the late response, according to Kim Jong-bok, was because Liaodong had become a buffer zone for the Tang and Parhae, which explains the relative peace between the Tang, Parhae, and Silla in contrast to the Goguryeo period.

== List of protector generals ==
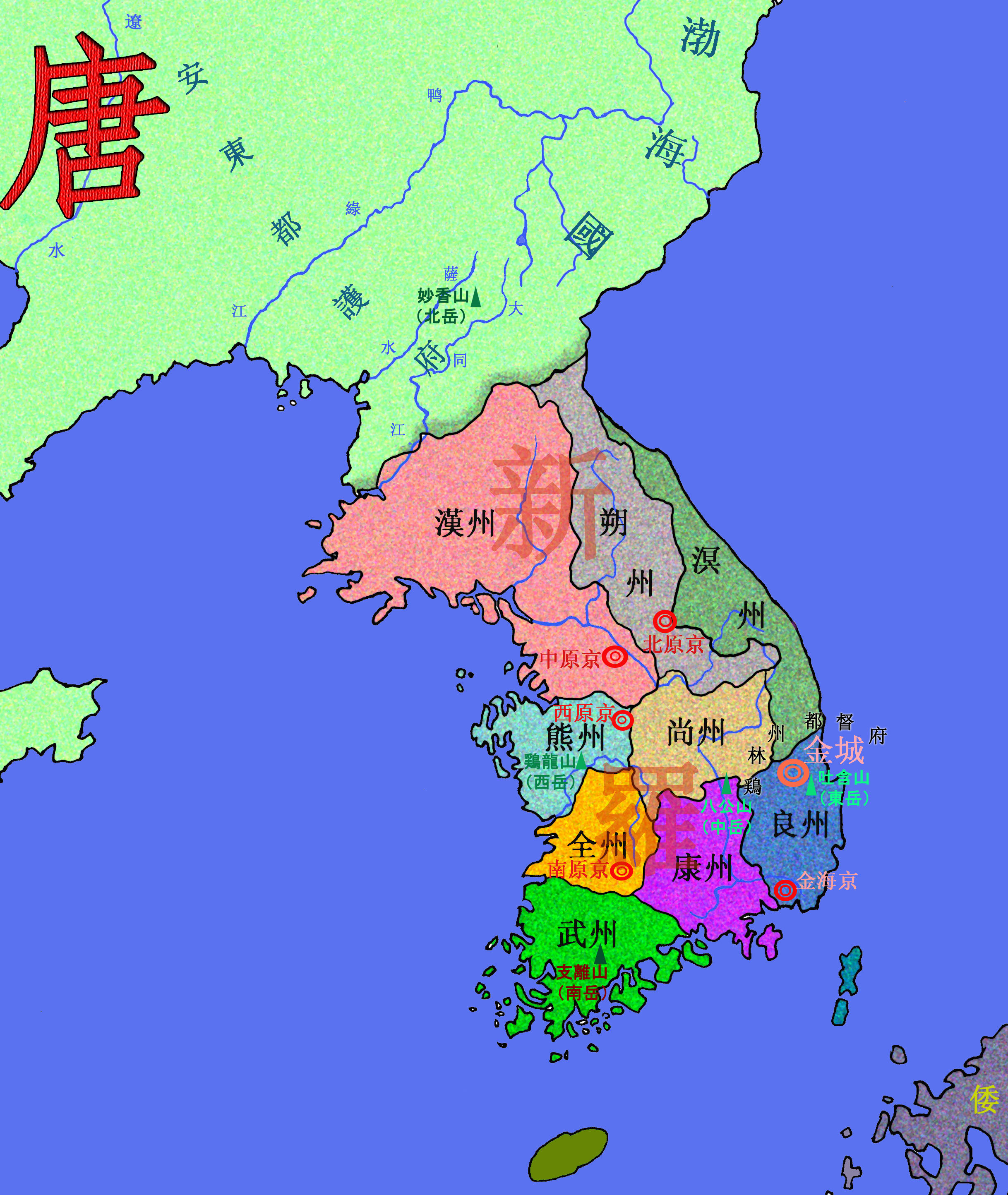
The Andong protectorate, above Unified Silla

- Wei Zhe (668–669)
- Xue Rengui (669–670) – 안동도호부사/安東都護府使
- Gao Kan (670–676)
- Bojang of Goguryeo (677–681) – (Hangul : 요동주도독 조선왕 Hanja:遼東州都督朝鮮王) and (Hangul : 조선군왕 Hanja:朝鮮郡王)
- Qu Tuquan (681–685)
- Xue Ne (685–696) 薛訥 – 安東道經略 안동도경락 – also military commander of Youjou
- Pei Xuangui (696–698) 裴玄珪
- Ko Tŏngmu (698–699) (Hangul : 고덕무 Hanja: 高德武), Son of Bojang – 안동도독/安東都督
- Tang Xiujing (704–705) 唐休璟
- Pei Huaigu (712) 裴懷古
- Sun Jian (712) 孫儉
- Shan Sijing (713) 單思敬
- Xu Qincou (714) 許欽湊
- Xu Qindan (714) 許欽澹
- Zhang Shuo (715–719) 張說
- Xue Tai (720–725) 薛泰
- Li Jiao (727–732) 李璬
- Pei Min (733–741) 裴旻
- Jia Xun (742–755) 賈循
- Wang Xuanzhi (756–758) 王玄志
- Hou Xiyi (758–761) 侯希逸

== Administrative area ==
Administratively, it was intended to oversee nine commanderies, 42 prefectures (later decreased into 14) and 100 counties.

=== Nine commanderies ===
- Shinseongju (Hangul: 신성주 Hanja/Hanzi: 新城州)
- Yoseongju (Hangul: 요성주 Hanja/Hanzi: 遼城州/辽城州)
- Gamulju (Hangul: 가물주 Hanja/Hanzi: 哥勿州)
- Wirakju (Hangul: 위락주Hanja/Hanzi: 衛樂州/卫乐州)
- Saraju (Hangul: 사리주 Hanja/Hanzi: 舍利州)
- Geosoju (Hangul: 거소주 Hanja/Hanzi: 去素州/居素州)
- Wueolhuiji (Hangul: 월희주 Hanja/Hanzi: 越喜州)
- Geodanju (Hangul: 거단주 Hanja/Hanzi: 去旦州)
- Geonanju (Hangul: 건안주 Hanja/Hanzi: 建安州)

=== 14 prefectures (州) ===
- Namso (Hangul: 남소주 Hanja/Hanzi: 南蘇州)
- Gaemo (Hangul: 개모주 Hanja/Hanzi: 蓋牟州)
- Daena (Hangul: 대나주 Hanja/Hanzi: 大那州)
- Changam (Hangul: 창암주 Hanja/Hanzi: 倉巖州)
- Mami (Hangul: 마미주 Hanja/Hanzi: 磨米州)
- Jeokri (Hangul: 적리주 Hanja/Hanzi: 積利州)
- Yeosan (Hangul: 여산주 Hanja/Hanzi: 黎山州)
- Yeonjin (Hangul: 연진주 Hanja/Hanzi: 延津州)
- Mokjeo (Hangul: 목저주 Hanja/Hanzi: 木底州)
- Ansi (Hangul: 안시주 Hanja/Hanzi: 安市州)
- Chebok (Hangul: 제북주 Hanja/Hanzi: 諸北州)
- Shikri (Hangul: 식리주 Hanja/Hanzi: 識利州)
- Buryeol (Hangul: 불열주 Hanja/Hanzi: 拂涅州)
- Baehan (Hangul: 배한주 Hanja/Hanzi: 拜漢州)

== See also ==
- Administrative divisions of the Tang dynasty
- Protectorate General to Pacify the West
- Protectorate General to Pacify the South
- Four Commanderies of Han
- Ungjin Commandery
- Gyerim Territory Area Command
- Chinese military history
- Honglujing Stele
- Three Kingdoms of Korea

== Bibliography ==
- Kim, Jong-bok (2014), A Buffer Zone for Peace: Andong Protectorate and Diplomatic Relations between Silla, Balhae, and Tang in the 8th to 10th Centuries, Korea Journal
- Lee, K.-b. (1984). A new history of Korea. Tr. by E.W. Wagner & E.J. Schulz, based on the Korean rev. ed. of 1979. Seoul: Ilchogak. ISBN 89-337-0204-0
- Wang, Zhenping (2013), Tang China in Multi-Polar Asia: A History of Diplomacy and War, University of Hawaii Press
- Xiong, Victor (2008), Historical Dictionary of Medieval China, United States of America: Scarecrow Press, Inc., ISBN 978-0810860537
