= House of Ko =

Royal family of Korean state Goguryeo

- Founded: 37 BC
- Founder: Dongmyeong of Goguryeo
- Final ruler: Goguryeo: Bojang of Goguryeo (642–668); Bodeok: Anseung (674–683)
- Titles: King of Goguryeo (37 BC – 19 BC, 53 AD – 668 AD); King of Bodeok (674–684)
- Deposition: Goguryeo: 668: Annexation by Tang and Silla; Bodeok: 683:Annexation by Silla

The House of Ko (Korean: 고씨 왕가) was the dynasty that founded and ruled over the ancient Korean kingdom of Goguryeo. Its founder, Chumong, broke away from another ancient Korean kingdom called Dongbuyeo to start his own kingdom.

== Founding ==
The House of Ko was founded and descended from one common ancestor, who was Chumong, also the first ruler of Goguryeo. Chumong was the son of Hae Mo-su of Buyeo and Lady Yuhwa. Lady Yuhwa was the daughter of Habaek, the god of the Amnok River or, according to an alternative interpretation, the sun god Haebak (Korean: 해밝). As a descendant of Hae Mo-su, Chumong was driven by the goal of reuniting all of Gojoseon's ancient territory into a single state. With this goal in mind, he set off from Dongbuyeo and began building the foundations for his kingdom. After three years, he had already conquered several of the neighboring kingdoms and was ready to go into the final phase of constructing his kingdom. He completed this phase by holding hands with Jolbon and bringing it under his control. In 37 BC, Chumong finally established his kingdom and named it 'Goguryeo'. He also changed his last name from 'Hae' to 'Ko,' which means 'high.' Goguryeo progressed and continued to grow stronger under Ko Chumong's reign of 19 years. His first wife and their son, Yuri, soon to be Emperor King Yuri, fled from Dongbuyeo and came to Goguryeo during the last year of Chumong's reign. Chumong proclaimed Yuri his successor and Crown Prince before dying five months later.

== Complete transition of the family name ==
King Yuri rose to the throne in 19 BC and ruled until his death in 18 AD. During the reign of King Yuri to King Mobon, the kings of Goguryeo used the surname of Hae. In 53 AD, when the young prince Ko Kung took the throne as King Taejo of Goguryeo, he became the first king with the Ko surname in 3 generations.

According to the Samguk sagi, the Goguryeo royal family claimed descent from the mythical god Gao Yang, who was the grandson of the Yellow Emperor of Chinese mythology, and thus took the surname of "Ko" (高); however, this legend was discredited in the commentaries (논찬; 論贊) by Kim Pusik, the compiler of the Samguk sagi, who concluded that both Baekje and Goguryeo originated from Buyeo.

== Height of power ==
Goguryeo's height of power came in the reign of King Gwanggaeto the Great of Goguryeo, who created and strengthened Goguryeo's cavalry and naval units to pacify the south and the north. Gwanggaeto the Great attacked and conquered Buyeo, Biryu-guk, the Later Yan, Malgal, and the Ainu tribes. Goguryeo's height of power finally came, but the bringer of glory died at the young age of 39.

== Decline ==
King Munjamyeong continued to expand Goguryeo's territories after receiving the full surrender of the ancient Korean state of Buyeo in 494. After the reign of King Munjamyeong, his son Heung-An became King Anjang. King Anjang continued to attack the southern kingdoms and weaken their power, further establishing the empire's power over both the Korean Peninsula and Manchuria. After King Anjang, his son became King Anwon.

== Fall of Goguryeo ==
Goguryeo's 27th ruler, King Yeongryu, submitted to the newly-risen Tang dynasty, despite the overwhelming victories that Goguryeo had achieved over the Sui. King Yeongryu was assassinated by Yŏn Kaesomun, who was Dae Mangniji (대막리지/Grand Prime Minister) of Goguryeo until 666 CE. King Bojang, the nephew of King Yeongryu, rose to the throne and ruled until 668 CE, when Goguryeo was destroyed by the coalition armies of the Tang dynasty and Silla.

With the fall of Goguryeo, surviving remnants attempted to re-establish Goguryeo, under military commander Kŏm Mojam and Ansŭng, an illegitimate son of King Bojang, as their king. However by 670, strife between Kŏm Mojam and Ansŭng led to the former's assassination and Ansŭng's submission to Silla. Ansŭng settled down in Kŭmma-chŏ (modern-day Iksan, South Korea) and was enfeoffed as the King of Bodeok, a Silla vassal state, in 674. By 683, Ansŭng was made to live in the Silla capital in Gyeongju. In 684, after a failed rebellion against Silla, Bodeok was annexed by the kingdom of Silla.

== See also ==
- History of Korea
- Three Kingdoms of Korea
- Taewang
