= Little Goguryeo =

Hypothesized state in Liaodong and northern Korea

Little Goguryeo 고려 高麗
- 699–820
- Dark yellow - Little Goguryeo, Light yellow - Balhae
- Status: Vassal state of Tang dynasty De facto independent kingdom
- Capital: Unknown
- Common languages: Goguryeo (Koreanic); Middle Chinese
- Religion: Buddhism, Confucianism, Taoism, Chinese folk religion, Korean shamanism
- Government: Monarchy
- History
  - Establishment: 699
  - Fall: 820
Preceded by	Succeeded by
Goguryeo; Protectorate General to Pacify the East	Balhae
- Today part of: China; North Korea

Little Goguryeo (Korean: 소고구려; Chinese: 小高句麗; alternatively Lesser Goguryeo) is the name of a state thought to have existed on the Liaodong Peninsula, proposed by the Japanese scholar Kaizaburō Hino. The existence of the state is debated among scholars. The name of gaoli (Goryeo) was mentioned in contemporary historical records, with its leaders recorded as Governors-General subject to the Tang dynasty in the documents of the Tang government. It was supposedly established by the refugees of Goguryeo after its defeat by the Tang dynasty.

Following Goguryeo's defeat by the Tang–Silla alliance, the Liaodong Peninsula was administered by the Tang dynasty. The theory is that the Tang dynasty eventually lost effective control of the region due to rebellions staged by Goguryeo refugees, and Liaodong became a buffer zone between the Tang dynasty and Balhae (Bohai). Although Lesser Goguryeo declared itself an independent kingdom, it was soon absorbed into Balhae.

== Establishment ==
In 699, the Tang government sent former Goguryeo prince Ko Tŏngmu, the third son of Goguryeo's last ruler, King Bojang, to Liaodong Peninsula, naming him "King of Chaoxian" and Governor of the Yodong Commandery of the Protectorate General to Pacify the East. Like his father, Ko Tŏngmu had plans to rebel against the Tang, to revive Goguryeo and to provide a kingdom for the Goguryeo people.

The Tang Empire at the time was undergoing several crises, especially the An Lushan Rebellion. Along with these major events was also the pressure given by the Empire of Balhae. These and many other pressures allowed Ko Tŏngmu to take full control of the Protectorate General to Pacify the East and allegedly to establish a kingdom.

The Lesser Goguryeo kingdom was established during that year with Ko Tŏngmu as its first king. Very little is known about how the neighboring kingdoms reacted to the establishment of Lesser Goguryeo. It is known that Balhae was on good terms with Lesser Goguryeo with respect to the similar purposes that the two kingdoms possessed.

== Fall ==
At around 820, after two generations of ruling the Liaodong Peninsula and other former regions of Goguryeo, Lesser Goguryeo was absorbed into Balhae during the reign King Seon of Balhae.

== See also ==
- Goguryeo
- Balhae
- Protectorate General to Pacify the East
- Ko Tŏngmu
