= Ansŭng =

7th century Korean ruler

Ansŭng (Korean: 안승; Hanja: 安勝; fl. 668–683), alternately Ansun (안순; 安舜), was thought to be either the nephew or illegitimate son of King Bojang of Goguryeo, the last King of Goguryeo. He was named the new King of Goguryeo by general Geom Mojam, but later he murdered Geom and submitted to the Korean kingdom of Silla, taking up residence in the Silla capital of Gyeongju.

== Background ==
Ko Ansŭng was the nephew of King Bojang of Goguryeo, and a prince of Goguryeo before its fall. In some Chinese sources, Ko Ansŭng is recorded as the grandson of Bojang, the last king of the ancient Korean kingdom of Goguryeo.

== Ruler of a rump Goguryeo ==
In 668, Prince Ansŭng was in Silla, where he had been held as hostage for many years. Upon hearing of his kingdom's defeat and downfall, he searched for survivors and first sought permission to revive his kingdom. Ansŭng encountered the high Goguryeo official Geom Mojam, also in flight. Together they forged an alliance to revive the Goguryeo kingdom. Ansŭng was crowned ruler of the new Goguryeo, centered in the city of Hansung, in today's South Hwanghae province, North Korea. Envoys were soon dispatched to Silla seeking a restitution of some territory for a revived Goguryeo kingdom as well as a defensive alliance with "the Great State" (i.e. Silla). Silla, eager to break its ties with Tang, which following the defeat of Goguryeo and Baekje now threatened to impose its hegemony over the former Baekje and Goguryeo territories, agreed to reestablish, and ally with, a revived Goguryeo under king Ansŭng. In the eighth month of 670, King Munmu of Silla sent a royal decree to Ansŭng, reading in part:

Now people cannot be without a ruler and August Heaven must have one to entrust with the mandate. You and you alone are true descendant of your former king [Bojang]; who but you can lead the ancestral sacrifices?...Reverently my emissary...and others have been dispatched to quickly unroll this decree of enfiefment which orders you to be King of Goguryeo. You must gather together and calm your refugee peoples, continue old ties and give them new life, be as a neighbor state for all times and conduct affairs as brothers."

King Munmu then bestowed upon him the title of King of Bodeok (보덕국왕; 報德國王), and bequeathed him a small piece of territory in the vicinity of what is today the city of Iksan near the former Baekje capital at Buyeo, ostensibly to serve as a roadblock to the expected Tang attempts to control that region.

== The end of the Kingdom of Bodeok ==
The revived Goguryeo territory of Bodeok soon became a haven for remnants of the Goguryeo population. Shortly thereafter in 672, and under circumstances unknown but evidence of internal turmoil within the new kingdom, Geom was killed under Ansŭng's orders.

In the third year of the reign of Silla's King Sinmun (683), in the wake of rebellious plots by Silla aristocrats against King Sinmun (plots that also involved the general Taemun (대문; 大文), a relative of Ansŭng), Silla abolished the small kingdom of Bodeok and Ansŭng was made to reside in the Silla capital of Gyeongju, where he was granted the official title of sop'an (소판; 蘇判), bestowed with the clan name of Kim (金), and given a generous piece of land and magnificent dwelling. The Kingdom of Bodeok came to an end and the remnant Goguryeo populace there was repopulated in various locales in the south.

The date and circumstances of Ansŭng's death are unknown.

== In popular culture ==
- Portrayed by Kang Ji-hoo in the 2006–2007 KBS TV series Dae Jo-yeong.

== See also ==
- History of Korea
- Three Kingdoms of Korea
- Geom Mojam

Ansŭng House of Ko
Regnal titles
Preceded by Bojang	King of Goguryeo; 668–670	Succeeded by Himself as King of Bodeok
Preceded by Himself as King of Gouryeo	King of Bodeok; 670–683	Title abolished
