= Ko Tŏngmu =

Prince of Goguryeo (fl. 8th century)

- Hangul: 고덕무
- Hanja: 高德武
- RR: Go Deokmu
- MR: Ko Tŏngmu

Ko Tŏngmu (Korean: 고덕무; Hanja: 高德武; r. 699-?) was a prince of Goguryeo and the founder of Lesser Goguryeo. He was the third son of King Bojang.

== Revival movement ==
Ko Tŏngmu was appointed to the position of Governor of the Protectorate General to Pacify the East in 699, after his nephew Ko Powŏn refused the position.

== See also ==
- Lesser Goguryeo
- King Bojang
- Goguryeo
- Protectorate General to Pacify the East (Andong Dohubu)

== Sources ==
- http://www.dragon5.com/news/news2004031602.htm (한국일보 2004-3-16)
- https://web.archive.org/web/20070928133409/http://www.baedalguk.com/bbs/zboard.php?id=free&page=1&sn1=&divpage=1&sn=off&ss=on&sc=on&select_arrange=headnum&desc=asc&no=266
