= Bojang of Goguryeo =

Last King of Goguryeo (r. 642–668)

Bojang 보장
- Taewang

King of Goguryeo
- Reign: October 642 – September 668 A.D.
- Coronation: October 642 A.D.
- Predecessor: Yeongnyu
- Born: Ko Pojang/Chang; Unknown; Pyongyangseong
- Died: December 682 A.D. Dongnalla
- Burial: Aside the Hiligaman Tomb
- Issue: Pongnam; Immu; Tŏngnam; Tŏngmu; Ryŏn; Yak'gwang; Anseung; Insŭng
- House: Ko
- Dynasty: Goguryeo
- Father: Ko Taeyang
- Religion: Buddhism
- Occupation: King

- Bojang of Goguryeo
- Hangul: 장; 보장
- Hanja: 臧, 寶臧
- RR: Jang; Bojang
- MR: Chang; Pojang

Monarch name
- Hangul: 보장왕
- Hanja: 寶藏王
- RR: Bojangwang
- MR: Pojangwang

Bojang (died 682; r. 642–668) was the 28th and last monarch of Goguryeo, the northernmost of the Three Kingdoms of Korea. He was placed on the throne by the military leader Yŏn Kaesomun. His reign ended when Goguryeo fell to the allied forces of the southern Korean kingdom of Silla and the Chinese Tang dynasty.

== Background ==
The period of his rule over Goguryeo is recounted in the final two books of the annals of Goguryeo in the Samguk sagi. Bojang's given name was Jang, though he was also known as Bojang. Bojang was the nephew of the previous king, king Yeongnyu and son of Go Dae-Yang. In 642, the general Yŏn Kaesomun carried out a coup d'etat and killed Yeongnyu and many of his supporters. Bojang was then placed on the throne.

With the aim of inducing Goguryeo to join an expedition against Baekje, Silla dispatched Kim Ch'unch'u to request the commitment of troops but Goguryeo did not consent.

For most of his reign, Bojang was a puppet, giving a veneer of legitimacy to Yŏn Kaesomun's military rule. For example, at Yŏn's instigation he supported Taoism and issued edicts repressing Buddhism in the country, which had formerly been officially Buddhist.

Goguryeo experienced many natural disasters during his reign.

== Reign ==
Goguryeo continued battle against the southern Korean kingdom of Silla, in alliance with the third of the Three Kingdoms, Baekje. Silla was further isolated by Goguryeo's restored relations with the Wa of Japan. In 642, Silla sent Kim Ch'unch'u to negotiate a treaty, but when Yŏn Kaesomun demanded the return of the Seoul region, talks broke down, leading Silla to eventually ally with the Tang dynasty.

In 645, the Emperor Taizong of Tang led a major expedition against Goguryeo by land and sea, but Yŏn Kaesomun and Yang Manch'un repelled the invasion, as well as subsequent smaller attacks by the Tang. In 654, Goguryeo attacked the Khitans, who were allied with the Tang. In 655, Goguryeo and Baekje attacked Silla.

The Baekje kingdom finally fell to Silla-Tang in 660. Yŏn Kaesomun defeated major invasions of Pyongyang in 661 and Sasu River in 662, but Silla and Tang were now free to focus and intensify their attacks against Goguryeo. In 663, the Baekje revival movement ended as its leader Buyeo Pung retreated to Goguryeo.

After the death of Yŏn Kaesomun in 666, Bojang was unable to gain control over the country, which instead was wracked by a succession struggle between Yŏn's sons.

== Fall of Goguryeo and after ==
As internal struggles continued in Goguryeo, Yŏn Namsaeng defected and 40 castles near the border surrendered to the Tang, while Yŏn Chŏngto, Yŏn Kaesomun's brother, defected to Silla.

The Goguryeo capital fell to Silla-Tang forces in the ninth lunar month of 668, and King Bojang was captured. He was appointed to the minister of public works (工部尚書) by Tang Gaozong.

Tang faced increasing problems ruling the former inhabitants of Goguryeo, as well as Silla's resistance to Tang's remaining presence on the Korean Peninsula. In 677, the Tang insisted on crowning Bojang as the "King of Joseon" and put him in charge of the Liaodong Commandery (요동주도독 조선왕; 遼東州都督朝鮮王) of the Protectorate General to Pacify the East.

However, Bojang continued to foment rebellions against Tang in an attempt to revive Goguryeo, organizing Goguryeo refugees and allying with the Malgal tribes. He was eventually banished to Sichuan in 681, and died the following year.

Because Bojang was the last ruler of Goguryeo, he did not receive a temple name after his death. There was a brief attempt at Goguryeo restoration made by Anseung, who ultimately surrendered to Silla.

One of his sons Ko Yak'gwang settled in Japan in 666 where he founded the Koma clan and became known as Koma no Koshiki Jakkō.

Ko Tŏngmu was a prince of Goguryeo and founded Lesser Goguryeo. He was the third son of King Bojang.

== Family ==
- Father: Prince Taeyang (대양; 大陽)
  - Grandfather: King Pyeongwon (평원왕; 平原王)
- Sons from first wife:
  - Ko Pongnam (고복남) – last Crown Prince of Goguryeo.
  - Ko Immu (고임무) – last Magniji of Goguryeo.
  - Ko Ryŏn (고련)
  - Ko Tŏngmu (고덕무)
  - Ko Yak'gwang (고약광; 高若光) "Jakkō" – ancestor of the Koma clan in Japan.
- Son from second wife:
  - Anseung (안승; 安勝)
  - Insŭng (인승; 仁承) – ancestor of the Hoengseong Go clan (also known Goguryeo Go Clan) royal family of Goguryeo in Korea.
- Grandsons:
  - Ko Powŏn (고보원) – Go Pongnam's son.
  - Ko Chin (고진) – Go Ryŏn's son.
  - Koma no Ieshige (高麗家重) – Ko Yak'gwang's son in Japan.

== In popular culture ==
- Portrayed by Kil Yong-woo in 2006–2007 KBS TV series Dae Jo-yeong.
- Portrayed by Ahn Shin-woo in the 2012–2013 KBS1 TV series Dream of the Emperor.
- Portrayed by On Joo-wan in 2013 KBS2 TV series The Blade and Petal.
- Portrayed by Ham Ji Sung in the 2017 KBS TV series Chronicles of Korea

== See also ==
- History of Korea
- List of Korean monarchs
- Three Kingdoms of Korea
- Yŏn Kaesomun

Bojang of Goguryeo House of Ko Died: 682
Regnal titles
Preceded by Yeongnyu	Monarch of Goguryeo; 642–668	Succeeded by Anseung
