= Imperial Privileged Oriental Company =

Former Austrian trading company

The Imperial Privileged Oriental Company was a state-organized Austrian trading company at the time of Charles VI. 1719 to 1740.

== Background ==
The first attempts of a centralised economic policy in the Austrian lands arose immediately after the Thirty Years' War. The Bohemian towns had petitioned Ferdinand III to refine their own raw materials into more finished goods for export, and Johann Joachim Becher, the most original and influential of the Austrian cameralists, became the leading force in attempting this conversion.

Emperor Leopold I sent Becher on a mission to the Netherlands, where he was made councillor of commerce (Commerzienrat) at Vienna in 1666 and he inspired the creation of a Commerce Commission (Kommerzkollegium) in the same city. Becher led the reestablishment of the first postwar silk plantation on the Lower Austrian estates of Hofkammer President Sinzendorf. He then subsequently helped create a Kunst- und Werkhaus in which foreign masters trained non-guild artisans in the production of finished goods.

By 1672 he had promoted the construction of a wool factory in Linz. Four years later he established a textile workhouse for vagabonds in the Bohemian town of Tabor that eventually employed 186 spinners under his own directorship.

An edict by Leopold I in 1689 had granted the government the right to monitor and control the number of masters and cut down on the monopoly effect of guild operations.

Even previous to this, Becher, who was against all forms of monopoly, surmised that a third of the Austrian lands’ 150,000 artisans were "Schwarzarbeiter" who were not in a guild. Becher sought to balance between the need to reinstate postwar levels of population and production both in the countryside and the towns. Yet, by leaning more seriously on trade and commerce, Austrian cameralism helped to transfer attention to the troubles of the monarchy’s urban economies.

Before his death, Ferdinand III had already taken some corrective steps by attempting to ease the debts of the Bohemian towns and to put limits on some of the land-holding nobility’s commercial rights. Austrian markets had to be opened to world commerce. One of the big obstacles for the implementation of these policies was the Venetian monopoly on the Adriatic which effectively prevented ships form other countries to fare freely on this closed sea at the time known also as the “Gulf of Venice”.

Success was achieved under Charles VI. In 1717, after another victorious campaign against the Ottomans (but this time with Venice as its ally), the Adriatic Sea was promptly declared free for trade, with Venice no longer opposing it. In 1718, the Peace of Passarowitz was concluded with the Ottoman Empire, and a commercial treaty brought important commercial liberties to the Ottoman and Habsburg subjects.

On March 18, 1719, Trieste and Fiume were declared free ports (punti franchi) of the Empire of the Habsburgs, with the Freihafenpatent. The Oriental Company moved its headquarters from Antwerp to Trieste in the same year.

== History ==
As the capstone of his efforts to improve commerce to the East, in 1719 Charles VI granted a charter to the Imperial Privileged Oriental Company (Kaiserliche privilegierte orientalische Kompagnie) to carry the banner of Austrian commerce in the Balkans. Alongside the more famous Ostend Company a private trading company established in 1723 to trade with the East and West Indies.

For a few years, it provided strong competition to the traditional colonial trading companies. In addition to the Emperor himself, Chancellor Philipp Ludwig Wenzel von Sinzendorf was a driving force behind the founding of the trading company that had a capital stock of 1 million thalers. Sinzendorf was temporary director of the company. It was hoped in Vienna through trade with the Ottoman Empire to stimulate the domestic economy.

The company was founded in the 1719. Its task was to export Habsburg goods to the Ottoman Empire. Its charter was modeled after the French society of John Law. The company accordingly had the exclusive rights to trade in the lands of the sultan either along the Danube and the Adriatic. Later it also started trade with Portugal. The Company had monopoly rights and was headed by officials of the state.

== Bankruptcy ==
However, the company had difficulties from the beginning, as the private traders the company most opposed to standing. Therefore, it was difficult to bring together the necessary capital. The Vienna City Bank filled this gap. Raising the rest by means of a lottery capital in 1721 and 1729 was a failure.

Beyond trade awarded the company the right to maintain their own factories and other production facilities and set up. In 1722 the company bought about the woolen mill in Linz (Linzer Wollzeugfabrik). The company dedicated a ship on the Adriatic. It started a sugar refinery and a candle factory. Offices were built, both in Belgrade and in Constantinople and the company had its branch offices in Trieste, Fiume and Messina, that being a part of the former Spanish possession was now transferred to the Austrian Habsburgs.

The company, after a decade of existence, could not prevail against the merchants from the Ottoman Empire itself. The Ostend Company was eventually closed down in 1731 following British pressure as part of the Treaty of Vienna creating an alliance between the two states. In 1740 also the Oriental Company had to declare bankruptcy after Austria rejected an offer of English and Dutch merchants, in 1732, to take over the company.

== Legacy ==
Nevertheless, the company fostered the development of the first manufactures in Austria, as many of its suppliers survived its bankruptcy. The new empress Maria Theresia did not give up and in a profoundly changed environment founded in Vienna a new Commercien Ober-Directorium in 1749, upon which all the commercial affairs of the empire is centred. In 1745 she united the administrations of all the ports within an Oberste Commerz-Intendenza (High Commercial Intendancy), which was originally established by her father in 1731. The Kommerzial-Intendanz was the first provincial imperial institution that ruled the City from 1748 until 1776. In 1749 Maria Theresa issued the „Haupt-Resolution" by which the civil and military Capitan of Trieste is put under the control of the Comercien Ober Directorium seated in Vienna.

All the region of the Littoral in fact becomes a territorial dependency of this new institution, specifically oriented to the development of commerce and thus very different from the other (still feudal) provinces. In 1759 the Compagnie privilégiée de Temesvár (called by the Kommerzial-Intendanz in Trieste also Jánosháza company) aimed at the export of Hungarian and Banat agricultural products (salted meat, tobacco, candles, tallow).

The Temesvár company operated from 1759 until 1769 before it went bankrupt by 1771. Its greatest success came during the Seven Years' War (reaching its peak in 1763 – 65) when it supplied France through Genoa of the goods she had previously imported from its American possessions. The sugar refinery built in Fiume in 1750 was perhaps the biggest success. The plant obtained the privilege as the only sugar producing plant in the Empire and in 1755 an act prohibited the imports of sugar from other countries. The turn happened when Charles Proli from Antwerp together with the Triestine commercial house Urban Arnold & Cie company provided the plant with Dutch personnel and equipment. At its peak the Company employed more than 1000 workers and employees in a time when Fiume had little more than 5000 inhabitants. Apart from sugar the company produced salted meat that was exported principally to France from where Haitian sugar cane was obtained. The company induced many spin-offs (such as candle and rope factories, etc.).

Industrial production in the city rose rapidly: according to the Ragusan diplomat Luka Sorkočević who in 1782 stayed in Fiume in his private diary estimated the value of the exported goods from Fiume at 2,5 million guldens. The next step was marked by the Austrian East India Company (Société impériale asiatique de Trieste et Anvers, or Société asiatique de Trieste), based in Ostend and Trieste, founded 1775 by William Bolts and wound up in 1785.

The Imperial Company of Trieste and Antwerp flourished despite the opposition of its rivals, the English and Dutch East India Companies, during the period when Britain found itself at war with the Dutch Republic and France as a development of the American War of Independence. The Imperial Company benefited from Austria’s neutrality during this conflict by being able to send its ships to Canton while its rival companies were prevented from doing so. When the war ended, the Dutch and English companies returned in a rush to Canton, which raised the price of Chinese tea and other goods there and caused a glut of them when the ships returned to Europe.

The trade from the Austrian Netherlands to India which had been recommenced by Bolts and the Imperial East India Company was continued after the collapse of that company in February 1785 by a group of Belgian and English merchants headed by the Vicomte Edouard de Walckiers, whose family had played a part in the story of the Ostend Company which traded to India earlier in the eighteenth century and who, together with the Marseilles banker Kick, had been one of the biggest shareholders in the Imperial Company.

== See also ==
- Ostend Company
- Austrian East India Company
- William Bolts
- Bankipur (Bengal)
- European chartered companies founded around the 17th century (in French)
