= Taj Fisherman's Cove Resort & Spa =

Luxury hotel in Chennai, India

Coordinates: 12.797531°N 80.248287°E

Taj Fisherman's Cove Resort & Spa, Chennai
- Interactive map of the Taj Fisherman's Cove Resort & Spa, Chennai area
- Hotel chain: Taj Hotels

General information
- Location: Chennai, India, Covelong Beach, Chennai, Tamil Nadu 603 112
- Opening: 1974
- Owner: Taj Hotels

Technical details
- Floor count: 2

Other information
- Number of rooms: 152 guest rooms
- Number of restaurants: 3
- Parking: Available

Website
- Official website

Taj Fisherman's Cove Resort & Spa, commonly called Fisherman's Cove, is a luxury beach resort near the coast of the Bay of Bengal in Chennai, India. Categorized as a 5-star deluxe resort by Ministry of Tourism, Government of India, it is a part of the chain of Taj Hotels, Resorts and Palaces and is classified under the group's leisure/resort hotels section. Owned by the Covelong Beach Hotels Limited, an associate of the Taj Group, the hotel is built on the ramparts of a ruined 18th-century Belgian castle.

== History ==
The Belgian of the Ostend Company, upon arriving at the coast led by Sir Godefroid Gollet de La Merveille (a Frenchman), built in the 1720s a magnificent fort in Covelong (Kovalam), a place provided by the Nawab of Arcot as a trading port. After the closing down of the Imperial Company in 1731, the fort was taken over by the French in 1746. The British vanquished the French in 1752, and with them the fort remained until independence. The Fisherman's Cove hotel is built on the ramparts of this ruined fortress. The hotel was opened in 1974. In 1996, the Indian Hotels Company entered a technical assistance agreement with Covelong Beach Hotel (India) Ltd to run the hotel.

In September 2010, the hotel was rebranded and renamed as Vivanta by Taj—Fisherman's Cove, Chennai.

== Location ==
Taj Fisherman's Cove Resort & Spa is situated 32 km away from the city of Chennai. It is near the Covelong Beach and the temple towns of Mahabalipuram and Kanchipuram.

== The hotel ==
Taj Fisherman's Cove Resort & Spa is set on a 48-acre land with Casuarina trees. Other facilities at the hotel include the following:

- A 10,000 sq ft (9 sq m) swimming pool, including a sunken bar and a children's pool.
- A fitness centre, with facilities for aromatic oil massages and chill showers.
- A 4,000 sq ft pillar-less hall named 'Casuarina', with a capacity of 300.
- A business center.
- A 3,000 sq ft main banquet hall.
- Facilities for recreation, including aquatics, tennis, etc.
- A Shopping arcade.

== Awards and honors ==
In 2023, the hotel was recognized with "Top Hospitality Honors" at the 8th International Hospitality Day organised by the International Hospitality Council (IHC) London and the International Institute of Hotel Management (IIHM).

== See also ==
- Hotels in Chennai
