= Siege of Bankibazar =

1744 siege in Hooghly

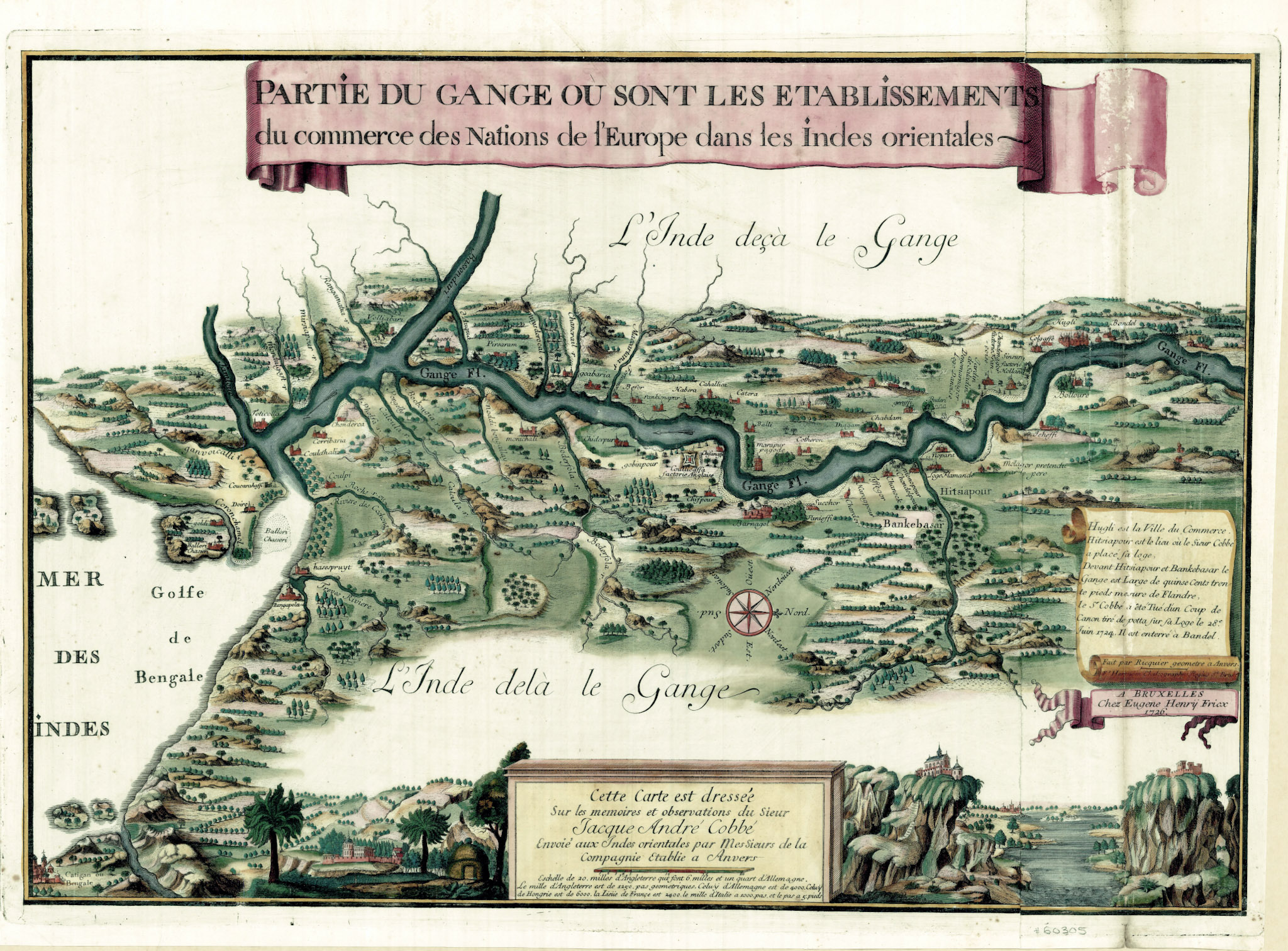
- European trading settlements on the Hooghly River including Bankibazar, Francois Harrewyn c. 1726
Date	22 September 1744
Location	Ichapore, Hooghly River, Bengal Subah 22°48′04.35″N 88°22′10.78″E
Result	Bengal Subah victory: Fall of Austrian Netherlands colony of Bankibazar
Territorial changes	Bankibazar annexed to the Bengal Subah

Belligerents
Bengal Subah	Ostend Company

Commanders and leaders
Mir Jafar; Sayeed Ahmed Khan; Subhan Singh; Husain Raza Khan	François de Schonamille

Strength
10,000 cavalry	Unknown

Casualties and losses
Unknown	2 ships captured
- Location within West Bengal Siege of Bankibazar (India)

The Siege of Bankibazar was a military action in September 1744 in which forces of the Nawab of Bengal, Alivardi Khan (r. 1740–1756), attacked the chief factory of the Ostend Company at Bankibazar near Hooghly. A dispute over customs duties and accusations of aiding the Marathas led to clashes between the Ostenders and the faujdar of Hooghly. After the Germans repelled a Mughal attack and routed their camp in a surprise night assault, Alivardi Khan ordered Mir Jafar to besiege the factory with 10,000 troops. The Ostend settlement was quickly abandoned, with contemporary accounts suggesting Mir Jafar accepted a bribe allowing the Germans to escape unharmed. The siege effectively ended the Ostend Company's presence in Bengal.

== Background ==
In 1724, the Ostend Company's first ship, the Emperor Charles, arrived in Bengal. Though the ship was lost on the Ganges, its crew occupied Bankibazar and built temporary houses. Within two years, three more ships arrived, and the Ostend factory quickly grew prominent. The factors soon replaced thatched huts with brick houses and walled the settlement. After a brief period of success, the company faced strong opposition from the English, Dutch, and French. In 1727, the Austrian monarch Maria Theresa (r. 1740–1780) of the Habsburg revoked its charter and banned trade with the East Indies for seven years. Despite this, the Ostenders continued trading in Bengal.

== Siege ==
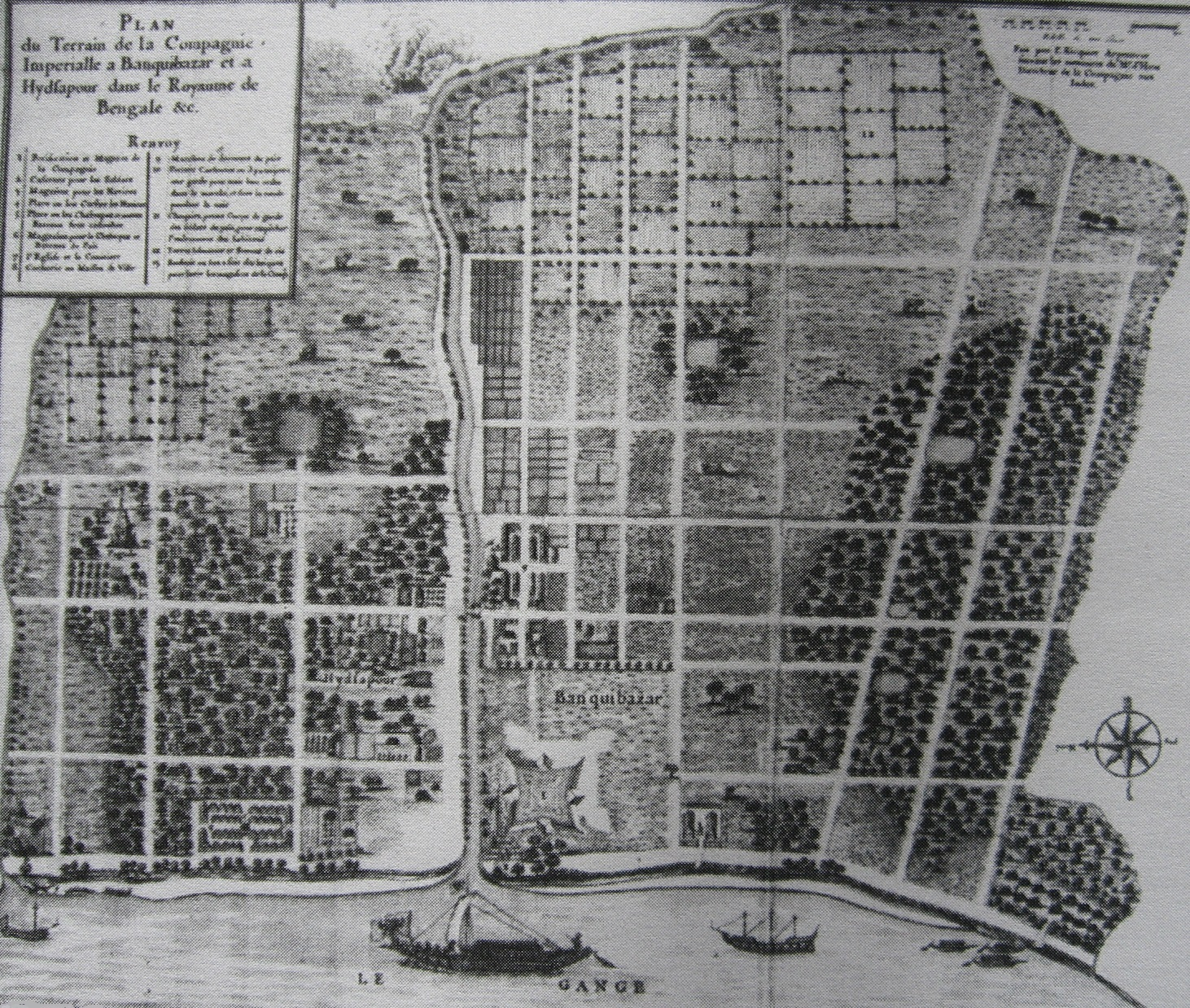
Illustration of Bankibazar, c. 1730

The chief settlement of the Ostend Company in India was established at Bankibazar. There, the Austrian flag was hoisted, and trade was carried on under its protection hence the enterprise was often referred to as the German Company. During the Maratha invasions, Sayeed Ahmad was appointed by Alivardi Khan to the post of faujdar of Hooghly. During his tenure, Sayeed Ahmad became embroiled in a dispute with the German traders at Hooghly over customs duties. The company's chief, Francois de Schonamille, was accused of aiding the Marathas and asked to pay a large indemnity. Then, situation escalated when one of his officers, Subhan Singh, imposed oppressive measures that provoked the Germans to launch a night attack on the Hooghly fort on 22 September 1744. The assault was repelled by the guards, forcing the Germans to retreat by boat the following morning. Though the town was set ablaze, two ships with valuable cargo were captured. In retaliation, Sayeed Ahmad dispatched Husain Raza Khan and Subhan Singh with a strong force to besiege the German factory. However, lacking military experience and lulled into a false sense of security, they encamped in the garden of the merchant Omichand near Hooghly. At midnight, the Germans mounted a surprise attack, throwing the camp into confusion and compelling the Mughal troops to flee. On hearing of this setback, Alivardi Khan ordered Mir Jafar Khan to punish the Germans. Mir Jafar acting at the instigation of English and Dutch traders, laid siege to Bankibazar with 10,000 troops. The factory was soon abandoned. Contemporary accounts suggest that Mir Jafar may have accepted bribe from the Germans, allowing them to escape unharmed.

== Aftermath ==
Schonamille and a few companions managed to escape, sailing down the Ganges and eventually taking refuge in Pegu, Burma. Three years later, Schonamille was killed in a skirmish among European traders. His companions continued piracy in the sea. Only a military factory in Ichapore exists in the place of the former Ostend colony.

== See also ==
- Siege of Hooghly
- Anglo-Mughal war

== Bibliography ==
- Sarkar, Jadunath, ed. (1943). The History of Bengal. Vol. II: Muslim Period. Delhi: B.R. Publishing Corporation. ISBN 81-7646-239-X.
- Roy, Atul Chandra (1968). History of Bengal: Mughal Period, 1526-1765 A.D. Vol. 3. Calcutta: Nababharat Publishers. Archived from the original on 2017-01-23.
- Datta, Kalikinkar (1939). Alivardi and His Times. University of Calcutta.
- Wanner, Michal (2009-01-01). "Bankibazar – Ostend and Imperial Factory in Bengal 1722-1744". Prague PHIR.
- Wilson, Charles Robert (2023-07-18). Old Fort William in Bengal: A Selection of Official Documents Dealing With Its History; Volume 2. Creative Media Partners, LLC. ISBN 978-1-02-190149-1.
