= Bankipur (Bengal) =

Village in West Bengal, India

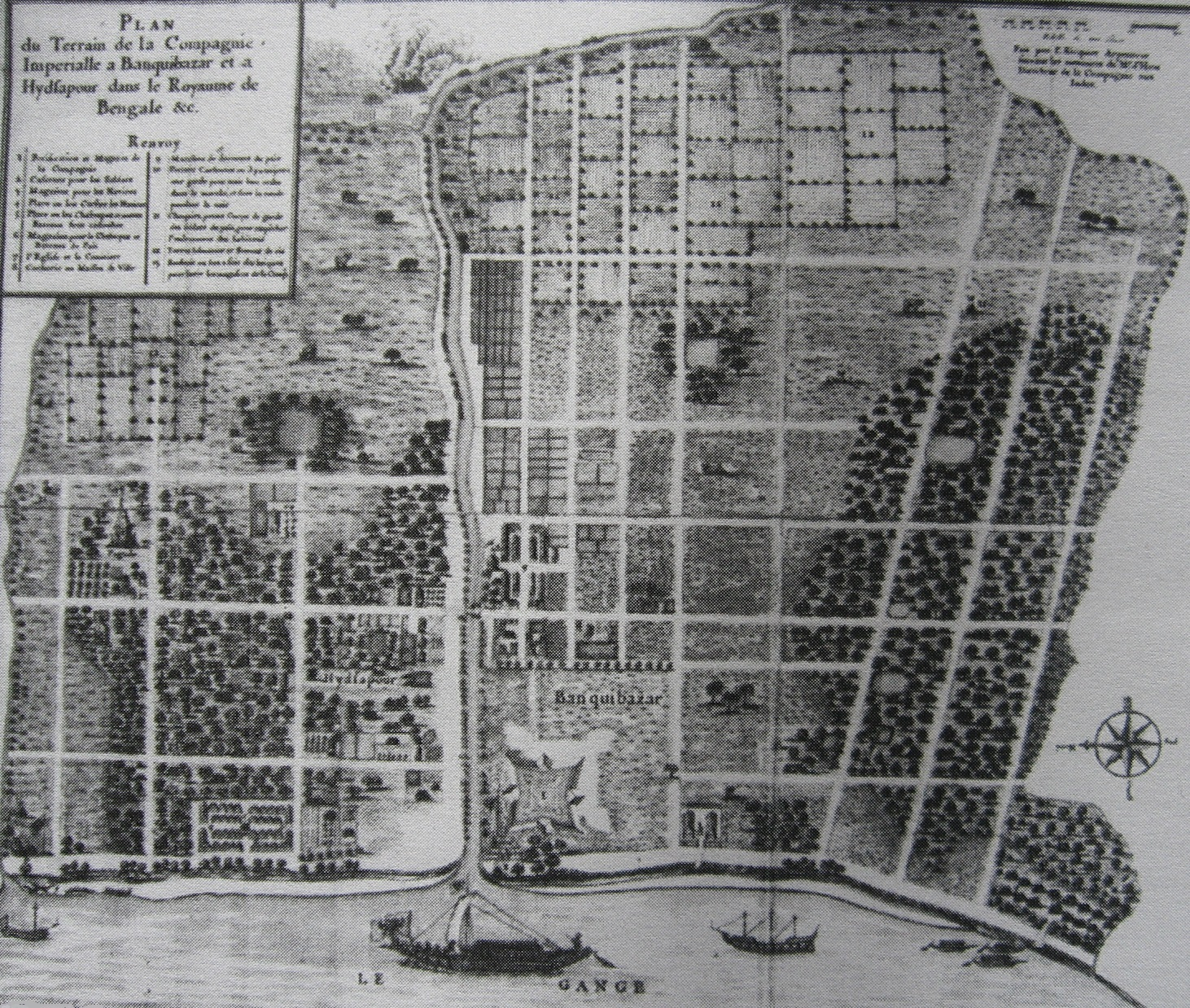
Map of "Banquibazar" and "Hydſapour" by the Ganges. 1764 copy of the original drawing (c. 1730)

Bankipur was an ancient village on the Hugli river located in what is now West Bengal, north of Barrackpore, a little north of Ishapore. It is now a suburb of Barrackpore and is not to be confused with Bankipur (Khejuri), a village located on the coast (at 21.76°N 87.86°E).

== History ==
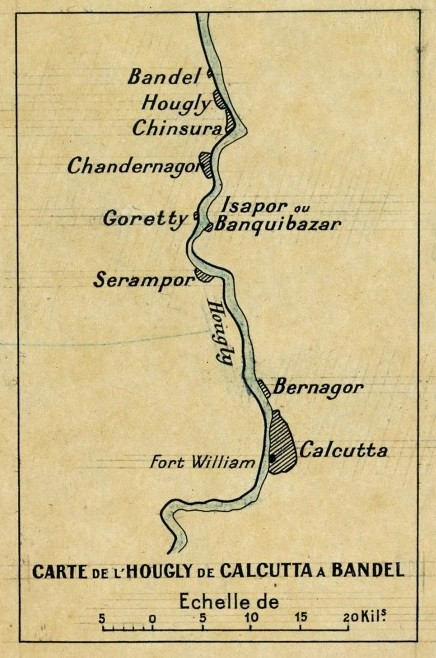
The location of the European factories along the Hooghly in 1749. Isapor ou Banquibazar is opposing French Goretty and Danish Serampor.

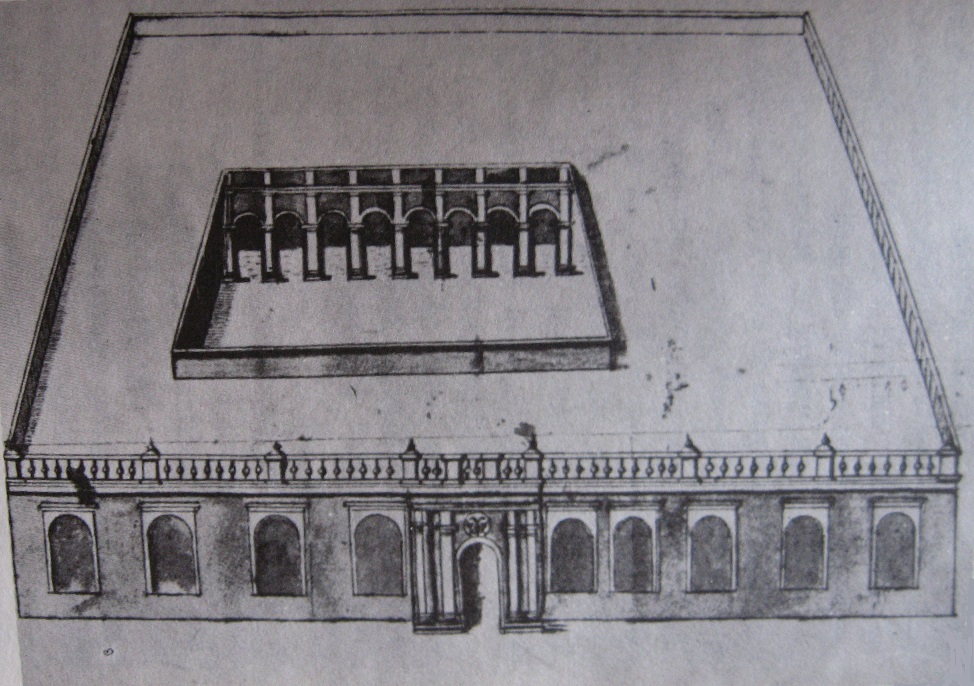
Palace of the governor of Banquibazar in the 1720s

Bankipur was famous as the principal settlement of the Ostend Company, the one great effort made by the Austrian Empire to secure a foothold in India. The Ostend Company was formed in 1722–1723, and with a capital of less than a million sterling founded two settlements, one at Coblom (Covelong) on the Madras coast between the British company at Madras and the Dutch one at Sadras, and the other on the Hugli between the British company at Calcutta and the Dutch Chinsura. Both the British and Dutch were offended and in 1727, in order to obtain the European guarantee for the Pragmatic Sanction, the court of Vienna resolved to sacrifice the Company and suspended its charter. It became bankrupt in 1784 and ceased to exist in 1793. But in the meantime in 1733 the British and Dutch convinced the Mughal general at Hugli to attack Bankipur. He attacked Bankipur and the garrison of only fourteen soldiers escaped and set sail for Europe. Thus imperial Austrian interests disappeared from India.
