= Covelong Beach =

Beach in Chennai district, Tamil Nadu, India

- Beach
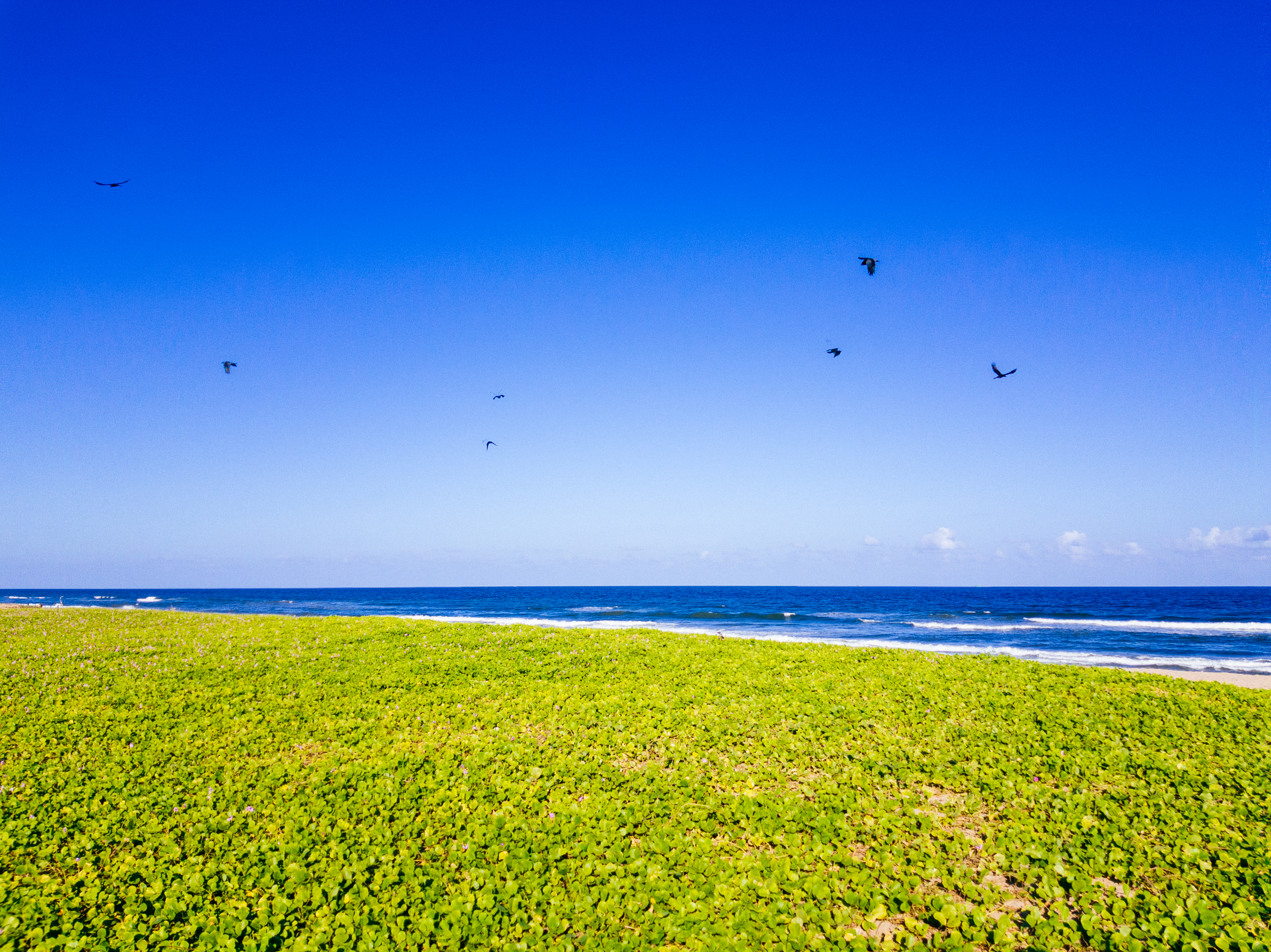
- Covelong Beach during Mid-day

- Location within Tamil Nadu
- Coordinates: 12.7896°N 80.2542°E
- Location: Covelong, Chennai, Tamil Nadu
- Elevation: 13.48 m (44.2 ft)

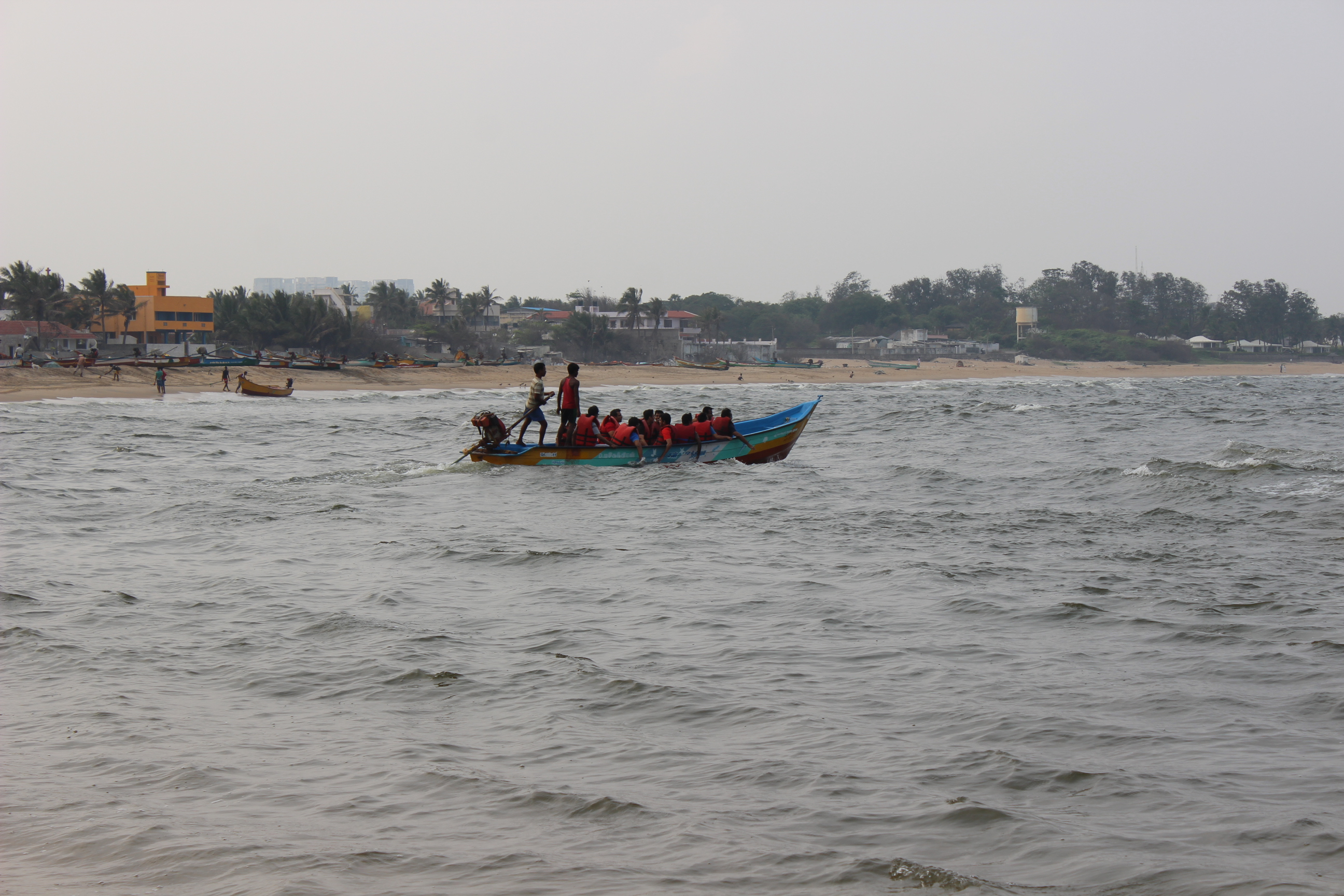
Kovalam Beach, Chennai - Mid Sea Diving

Covelong Beach (also called Kovalam Beach) is a beach located on the coast of the Bay of Bengal near a village named Covelong, Chennai, India. The British, unable to pronounce the name "Kovalam", named it Covelong. This is a coastal suburb and fishing village 40 km from Chennai. Covelong Beach is on the way to Mahabalipuram near the East Coast Road (popularly ECR).

Covelong Beach is known for its beauty. As it is near Chennai and is located on the way to Mahabalipuram, it is visited by thousands of people each day. Mostly the local crowd is higher in the beach.

Fishing is the main occupation of the people in the area. Though the beach is famous, it is littered by tourists and the local people alike.

Along with the beach, the village of Covelong, famous for its fishing activities draws many tourists. It is India's first surfing village, and home to surfing schools.
