= Ostend Company =

Holy Roman trading company (1722–1731)

- Company coat of arms

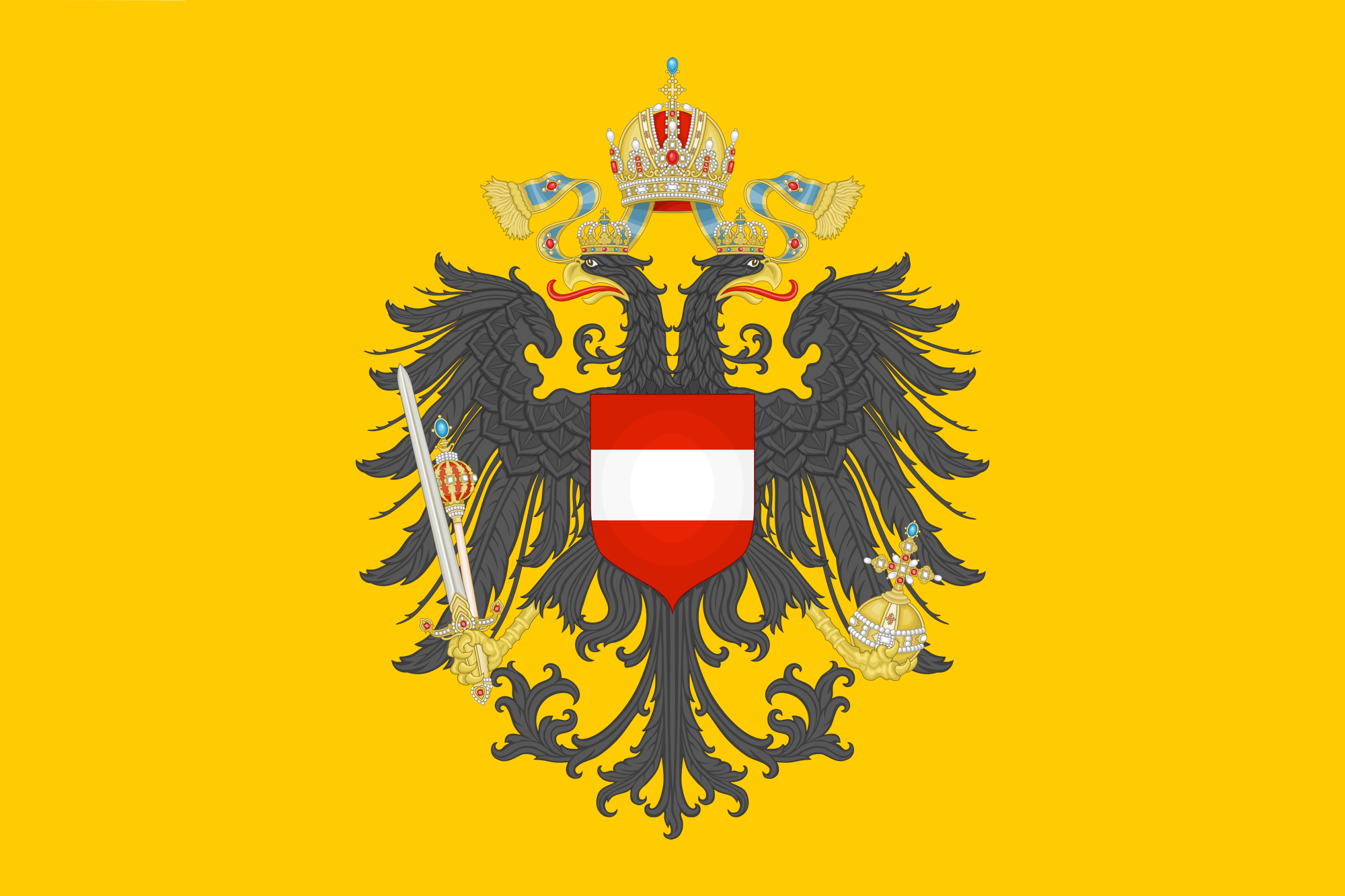
- Company flag
- Type: Chartered company
- Industry: Trade
- Founded: 19 December 1722
- Founder: Pieter de Potter, Thomas Ray and Charles VI
- Defunct: 16 March 1731
- Fate: Dissolved, in return for the signing of the Pragmatic Sanction by Great Britain and the Dutch Republic
- Headquarters: Antwerp, Southern Netherlands; Banquibazar, Bengal; Cabelon, India
- Area served: China; Mokha; India
- Key people: Paul De Kimpe; Thomas Ray; Colin Campbell; Jacques Maelcamp; Louis-François de Coninck; Jacques Baut
- Products: Tea, spices, silk, porcelain, metals, grain, rice, soybeans, sugarcane

The Ostend Company (Dutch: Oostendse Compagnie; French: Compagnie d'Ostende), officially the General Company Established in the Austrian Netherlands for Commerce and Navigation in the Indies (French: Compagnie générale établie dans les Pays-Bas Autrichiens pour le Commerce et la Navigation aux Indes) (Note: French was the official language of the Austrian Netherlands and the Company conducted its business in French and/or Flemish. Other names used were Compagnie impériale et royale établie dans les Pays-Bas autrichiens or the Compagnie générale. M. Wanner, The Establishment of the General Company in Ostend in the context of the Habsburg Maritime Plans, 2007, p. 55.) was a chartered trading company in the Austrian Netherlands (modern-day Belgium) in the Holy Roman Empire which was established in 1722 to trade with the East and West Indies. It took its name from the Flemish port city of Ostend.

For a few years it provided strong competition for the more established British, Dutch, and French East India Companies, notably in the lucrative tea trade with China. It established two settlements in India. Despite its profitability, the company was eventually ordered to close down in 1731 after the British government exerted diplomatic pressure on Austria, fearing the company's effects on their own traders. Its disestablishment was made a precondition for the Treaty of Vienna and for creating an alliance between the two states. The Ostend Company can be considered the first attempt by Austria to trade with the East Indies; the second being the much less successful Austrian East India Company, founded in 1775.

== Background ==
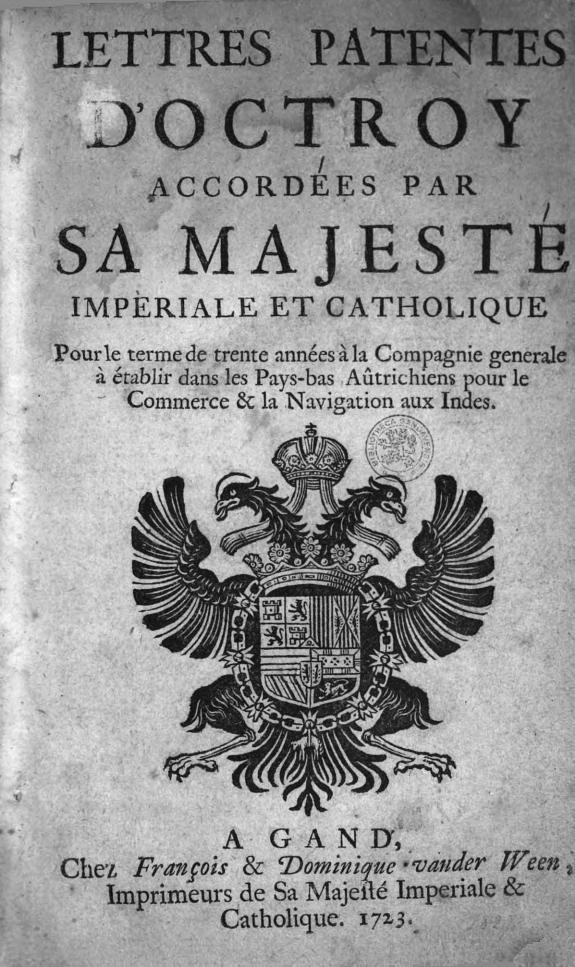
Title page of the Company's 1722 foundation charter

The success of the British, Dutch, and French East India Companies led the merchants and shipowners of Ostend in the Austrian Netherlands to want to establish direct commercial relations with the Indies. The trade from Ostend to Mokha, India, Bengal, and China started in 1715. Some private merchants from Antwerp, Ghent and Ostend were granted charters for the East India trade by the Habsburg government of the Austrian Netherlands, which had recently gained control of the territory from Spain. Between 1715 and 1723, 34 ships sailed from Ostend to China, the Malabar or Coromandel Coasts, Surat, Bengal, or Mokha. Those expeditions were financed by different international syndicates composed of Flemish, British, Dutch, and French merchants and bankers.

== Establishment ==
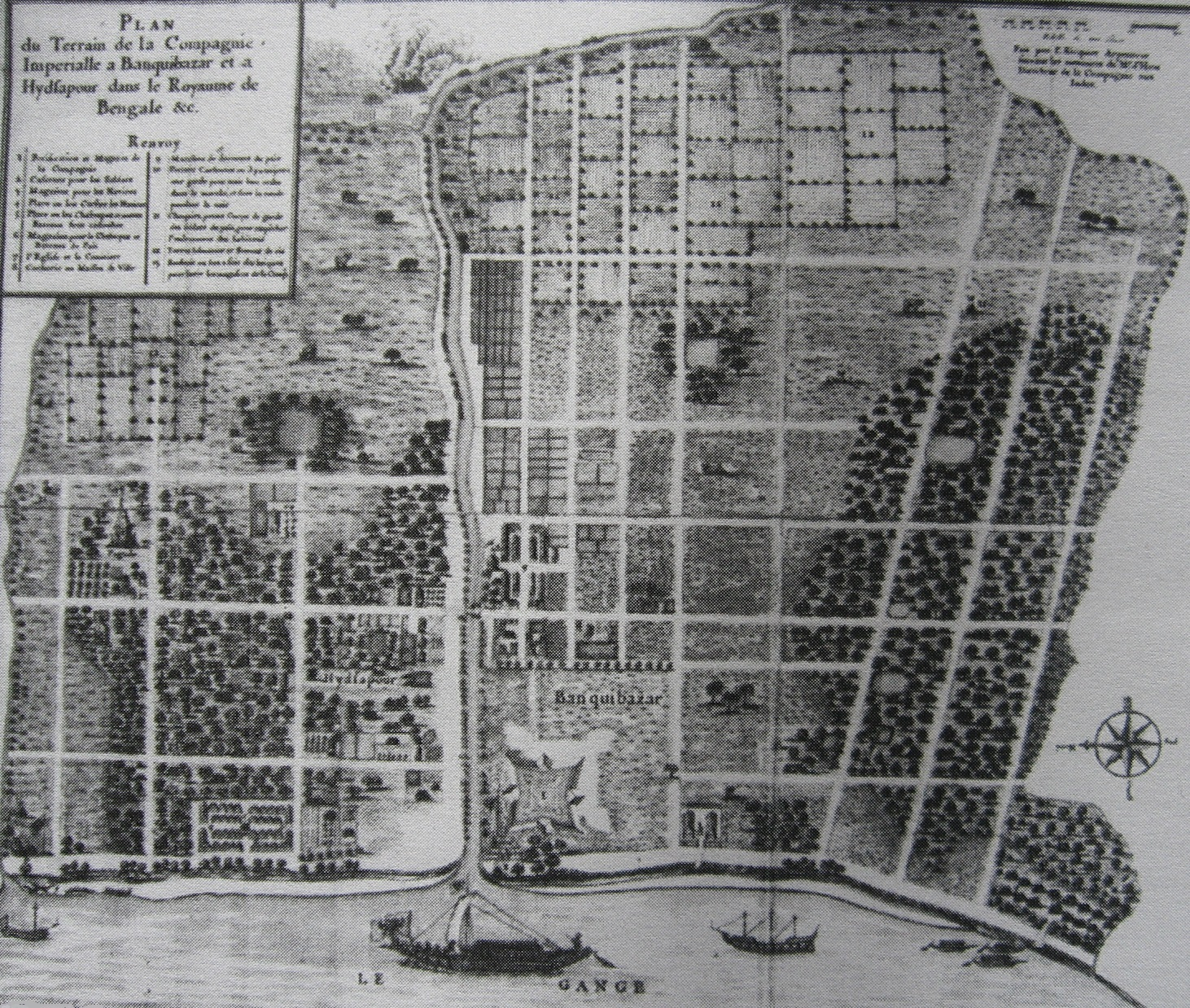
View of the Ostend Company's factory in Banquibazar

The mutual rivalry among the syndicates weighed heavily upon the profits and this resulted in the foundation of the Ostend Company, chartered by the Austrian ruler Charles VI, in December 1722. The capital of the company was fixed at 6 million guilders, composed of 6,000 shares at 1,000 guilders each. It was mainly supplied by the moneyed inhabitants of Antwerp and Ghent. The shares were issued on the Antwerp Exchange on 11 and 12 August 1723, with 3,037 of the shares coming to be held by 54 major investors, mainly Antwerp merchants. The seven directors were chosen from leading figures in trade and finance: Jacques De Pret, Louis-François de Coninck and Pietro Proli, from Antwerp; Jacques Maelcamp, Paulo De Kimpe and Jacques Baut, from Ghent; and the Irish Jacobite Thomas Ray, a merchant and banker based in Ostend. While the ships sailed from Ostend, the company's offices were located at the Stock Exchange in Antwerp. One of the leading shareholders was Leopold Philip, 4th Duke of Arenberg. The company's shares proved exceptionally profitable, providing a 15 percent return.

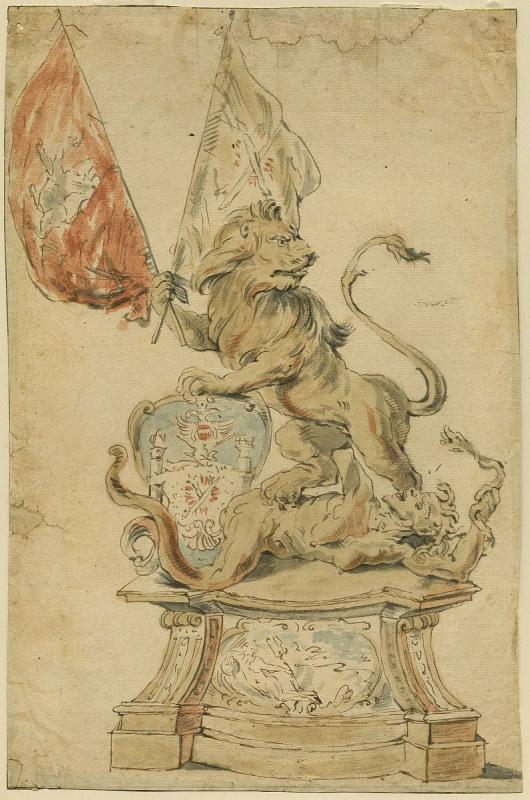
Drawing showing the solid gold lion of Ostend

The company also possessed two factories (trading posts), at Cabelon (modern-day Covelong) on the Coromandel Coast and Banquibazar (Ichapore) in Bengal.

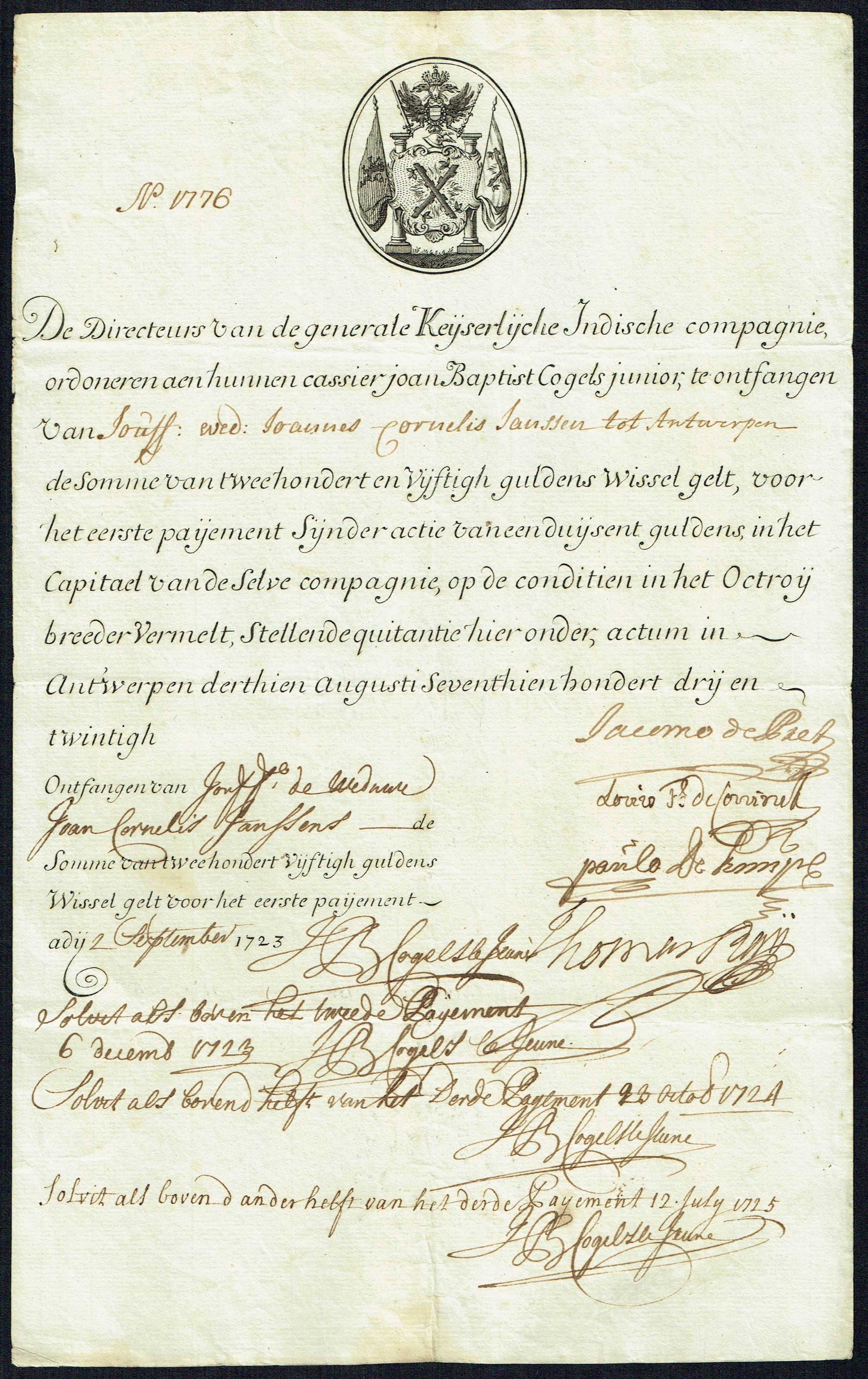
Share in the Ostend Company, issued 2 September 1723

Between 1724 and 1732, 21 company vessels were sent out, mainly to Canton in China and to Bengal. Thanks to the rise in tea prices, high profits were made in the China trade. Between 1719 and 1728, the Ostend Company transported 7 million pounds of tea from China (roughly half of the total amount brought to Western Europe), which would be about the same as British East India Company during the same period.

== Suspension ==
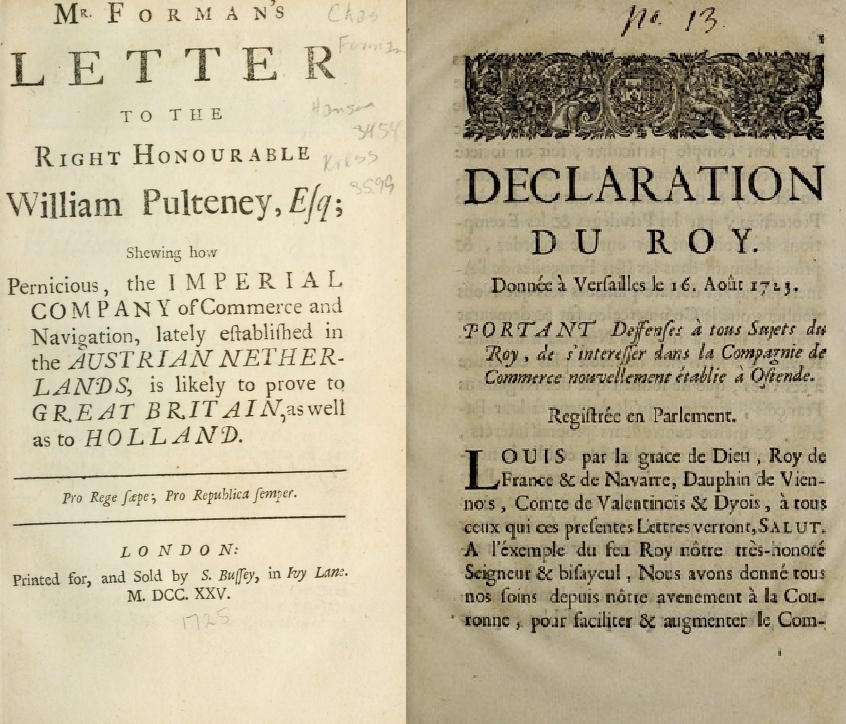
Pamphlet condemning the Ostend Company as "pernicious" to both British and Dutch traders (left) and a 1723 law forbidding French subjects from investing in the company (right).

From the outset, the new company provoked the open hostility of the other established East India companies which feared its formidable imperial patronage and the fact that many of the new company's employees in the East were former employees of the British, Dutch or French companies, who brought with them their experience in the Eastern trade. Furthermore, in order to attract foreigners with experience, the Ostend company allowed them generous allowances in terms of cargo space for private trade, something that was anathema to the existing monopolistic companies. Despite hostile acts from its competitors, the new company was quite profitable from the start and by 1726 was able to declare a 33 percent dividend.

However, in May 1727, the Emperor, under diplomatic pressure from the British and Dutch, suspended its charter for seven years and, in March 1731, the Second Treaty of Vienna ordered its final abolition. The flourishing Ostend Company had been sacrificed by Charles VI in order to secure the recognition of his daughter, Maria Theresa, and thus his dynastic succession under the Pragmatic Sanction of 1713. Between 1728 and 1731 a small number of illegal expeditions were organized under borrowed flags, but the very last ships sailing for the company were the two "permission-vessels" that left in 1732 and were a concession made in the Treaty of Vienna. The factory at Banquibazar, then under direct Imperial ownership, lingered on until well into the 1740s. The company officially ceased trading on 16 February 1734, and was wound up on 16 February 1737. Although officially disbanded, the shareholders secretly maintained the company as a vehicle for pooling investment until 1774. Many of the company's investors also became involved in the Swedish East India Company.

In the 1770s Austria re-established a colonial trading company, based on the model of the Ostend Company, to take advantage of the ongoing war between Britain, France and the Dutch Republic to take over a share of these countries' trade with India and China. This was the Société impériale asiatique de Trieste et Anvers, or Société asiatique de Trieste, also known as the Antwerp Company, founded in 1775 by William Bolts and Charles Proli, which was based in Ostend and Trieste and operated until 1785.

== Ships ==
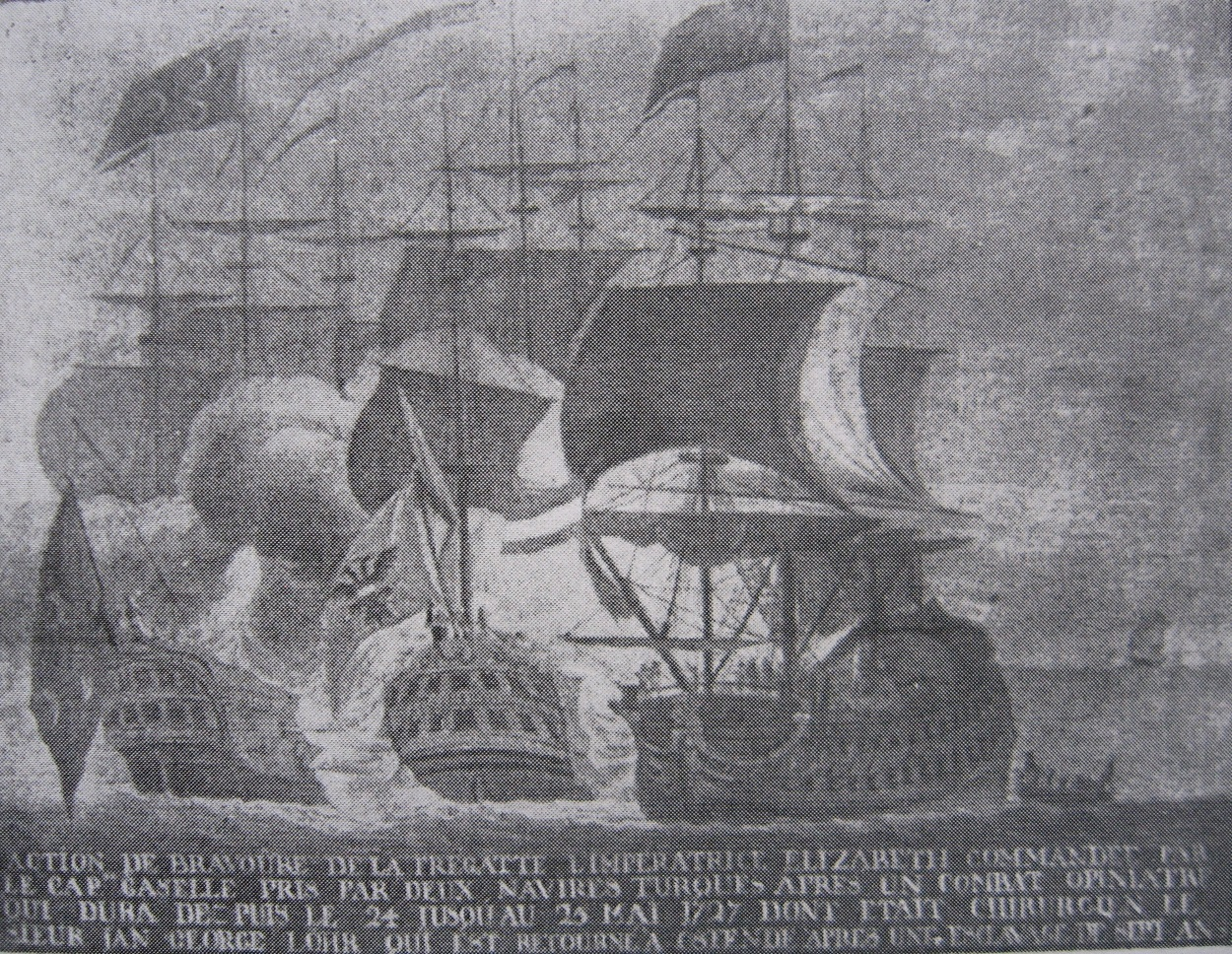
Barbary pirates capture the Impératrice Élisabeth of the Ostend Company, 1724

The ships used by the Ostend Company were medium-sized, with an average water displacement between 200 and 600 tonnes. Many were partly, or even completely, crewed by foreign sailors from England and elsewhere.

=== List of company ships ===
Ships operated by the Ostend Company included:

- L'Impératrice Élisabeth ("The Empress Elisabeth", also known as Impératrice) - a 28-gun ship, crewed by British sailors
- Espérance ("Hope") - 20-gun ship of the line
- Ville-de-Vienne ("City of Vienna") - formerly the British East Indiaman Heathcote
- Maison-d'Austriche ("House of Austria")
- Flandria ("Flanders")
- Saint-Joseph ("Saint Joseph")
- Prince-Eugène ("Prince Eugene")
- Aigle ("Eagle") - 26-gun frigate
- Sainte-Élisabeth ("Saint Elisabeth")- 22-gun frigate
- Saint-Charles, formerly Saint-François-Xavier ("Saint Francis Xavier") - 26-guns
- Charles VI (Emperor Charles VI) - 26-gun ship of the line
- Paix ("Peace") - 28-gun frigate
- Marquis-de-Prié ("Marquis of Prié") - 28-gun frigate (1727-1728 operated by Guillaume (Willem) Philips de Brouwer to China)
- Tigre ("Tiger") - 28-gun frigate
- Lion ("Lion") - 22-gun frigate
- Concorde ("Concord") - 30-gun ship of the line
- Keizerinne ("Empress") (1725-1726 operated by Guillaume (Willem) Philips de Brouwer to China)

== See also ==
- Bankipur (Bengal)
- History of India
- Siege of Bankibazar
- Trade between Western Europe and the Mughal Empire in the 17th century
- European chartered companies founded around the 17th century (in French)

== Notes ==
=== Bibliography ===
- de Burbure de Wesembeek, Albert (1963). Une anthologie de la Marine belge. Anvers: Lloyd Anversois. pp. 251–292.
- Butel, Paul (1997). Européens et espaces maritimes: vers 1690-vers 1790. Par cours universitaires. Bordeaux: Bordeaux University Press.
- Dumont, Georges-Henri (2000). L'épopée de la Compagnie d'Ostende 1723-1727. Bruxelles: Le Cri.
- Furber, Holden (2001). "East India Companies". In Kratoska, Paul H. (ed.). South East Asia, Colonial History: Imperialism before 1800. London: Routledge.
- Hertz, Gerald B. (1907). "England and the Ostend Company". English Historical Review. 22 (86): 255–79. doi:10.1093/ehr/xxii.lxxxvi.255.
- Keay, John (1991). The Honourable Company. A History of the English East India Company. London: Macmillan. ISBN 978-0736630481.
- Parmentier, Jan (1992). De Holle Compagnie: smokkel en legale handel onder Zuidnederlandse vlag in Bengalen, ca. 1720-1744. Zeven Provincien reeks (4). Hilversum: Veloren. ISBN 9065501118.
- Serruys, Michael-W. (2005). "Oostende en de Generale Indische Compagnie. De opbloei en neergang van een koloniale handelshaven (1713-1740)". Tijdschrift voor Zeegeschiedenis. 1: 43–59.
- Tassier, Suzanne (1954). "La compagnie d'Ostende". Annales. Économies, Sociétés, Civilisations. 9 (3): 378–81. doi:10.3406/ahess.1954.2302. S2CID 163060537.
- Dreijer, Gijs (2019). "The Afterlife of the Ostend Company, 1727–1745". The Mariner's Mirror. 105 (3): 275–287. doi:10.1080/00253359.2019.1615776. hdl:10871/37588. S2CID 199947724.
- Dhondt, Frederik (2015). "Delenda est haec Carthago. The Ostend Company as a Problem of European Great Power Politics (1722-1727)". Revue belge de philologie et d'histoire. 93 (2): 397–437. doi:10.3406/rbph.2015.8840. hdl:1854/LU-5708224. S2CID 153127918.
