= Covelong =

Fishing village in Chennai

Kovalam Covelong
- Suburb of Chennai
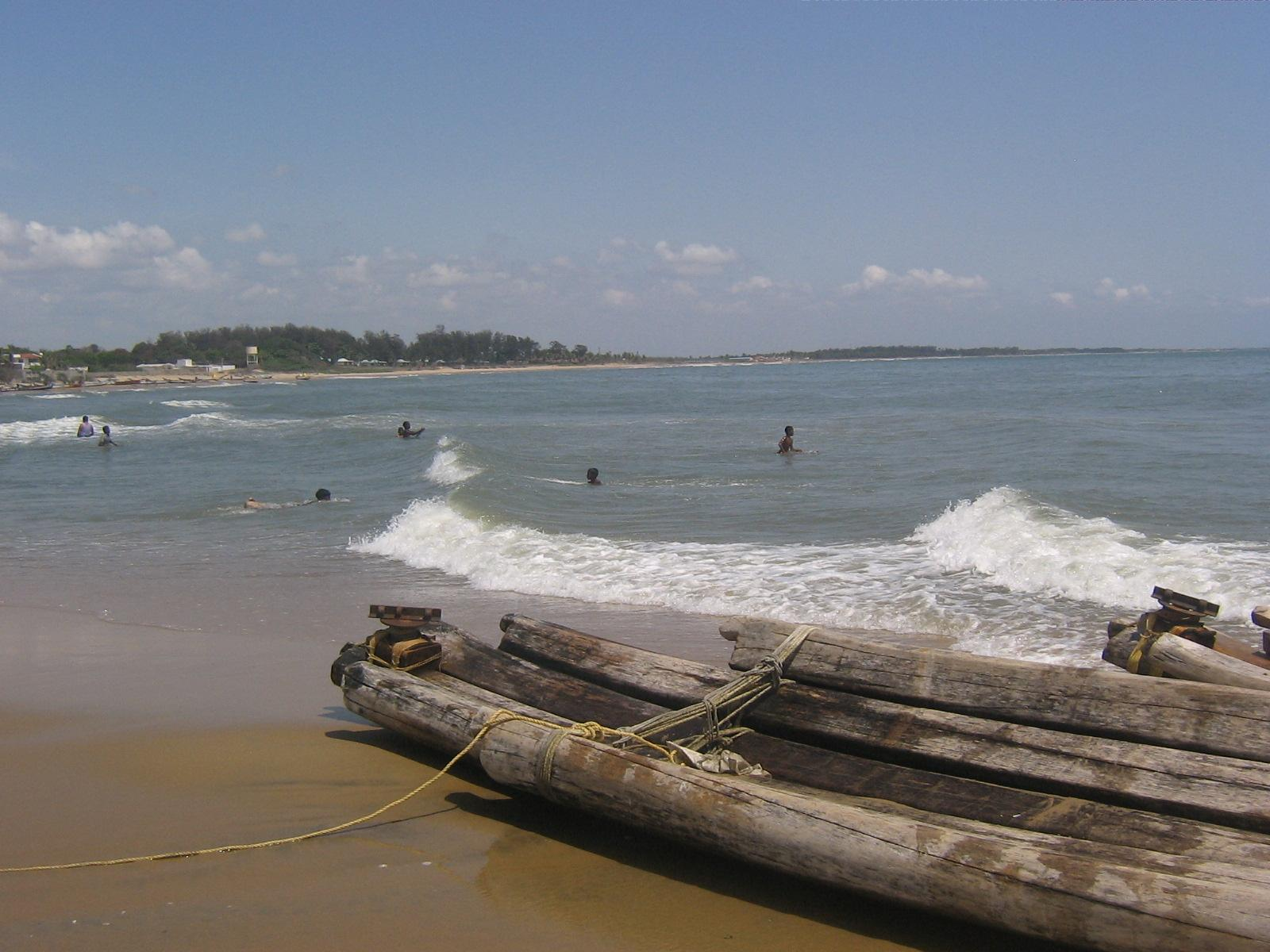
- Kovalam Beach, view from south

- Location in Tamil Nadu, India Kovalam (India)
- Coordinates: 12.7925°N 80.2530°E
- Country: India
- State: Tamil Nadu
- District: Chengalpattu
- Metro: Chennai

Languages
  - Official: Tamil
- Time zone: UTC+5:30 (IST)
- Nearest city: Chennai

Kovalam (Covelong) is a fishing village in Chennai, India, 40 kilometres south of Chennai, on the East Coast Road en route to Mahabalipuram. Kovalam (Cabelon in French = Kovalam) was a port town developed in the 1720s by the Ostend Company on a place provided by the Nawab of Carnatic Saadat Ali (the port was then also known as Sa‘adat Pattan, or Sadatpatnam, according to the name of the nawab). The factory was inaugurated in 1719 by Sir Godefroid Gollet de La Merveille (a Frenchman), and the building of a fort started at that time. After the closing down of the Imperial Company in 1731, the port was taken over by the French in 1746, and destroyed by the British in 1752.

The fort built by the Belgians in Kovalam during the Ostend factory times has been made today the Taj Fisherman's Cove, a private luxury beach resort. Another attraction is the ancient Catholic church on the beach, built in the 1770s. There is also a Dharga & temple nearby the beach.

Chennai Kovalam Beach is one of the few places in the East Coast where surfing takes place. There is a surf school with resort in the beach and samudra community yoga school in front of the beach.

Kovalam has a river mouth opening that flows almost throughout the year.

== Landmarks ==
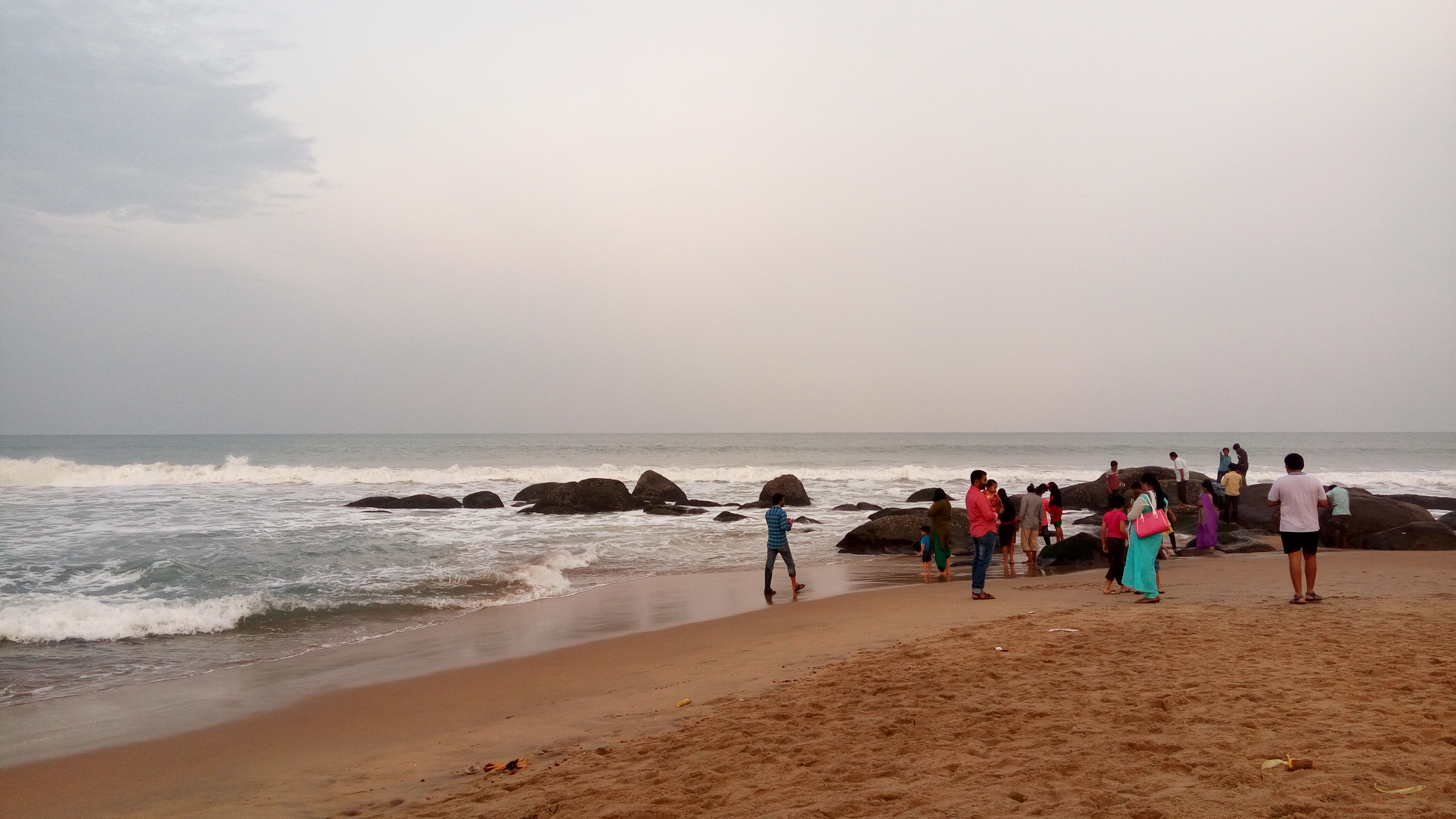
Big Rocks in Beach

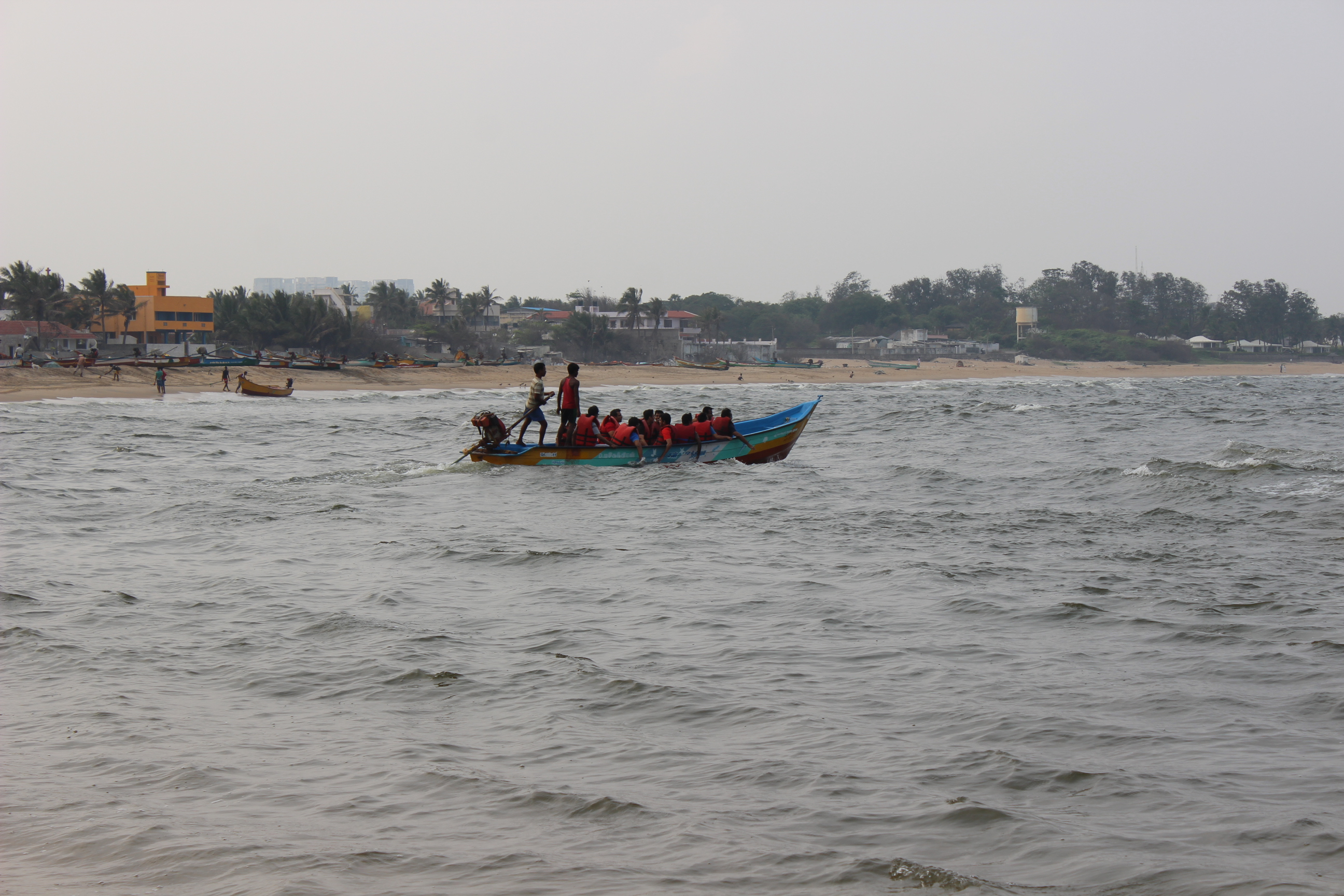
Kovalam Beach, Chennai - Mid Sea Diving

It is a coastal suburb located in Chennai City. Remnants of the Belgian fort can be seen in Fisherman's Cove, a luxury Taj hotel in Kovalam, while a fort and cemetery built by the Dutch are still to be seen in Sadras, south of Mahabalipuram.

Apart from being a popular tourist destination because of the wide beaches, the shallow ocean and the peaceful backwaters, history has influenced the existence of important places of worship for Hindus, Christians and Muslims. The construction of the Catholic Church, Our Lady of Mount Carmel, begun some time between 1770 and 1780 but it was left incomplete. It was a wealthy Portuguese merchant-prince who was a major land-owner in early 19th Century Madras, Sir John de Monte, who completed it between 1800 and 1808. According to the legend, his only son Christopher died at the age of twenty-two on his way back from Germany. As a result, Sir John's wife Mary, fell into a depression. One night, Sir John had a dream that if he completed the building of the church his wife would be cured. He did; and his wife was cured. He, his wife and his son are buried in the church.

Another benefactor in Kovalam was the Armenian Catholic, Sarquis Satur, who built a "chatram" in Kovalam (a place where pilgrims could rest, free of charge). A Latin inscription commemorating him is still visible there. It is not clear how long Christianity has been in existence in Kovalam. There are three wells that have crosses and cross-bones on their interiors, and this fact seems to pre-date the advent of the Portuguese, because they carved crosses on the exterior of wells, not the interior. Other wells of the same type are to be found on St. Thomas Mount, St. Thomas Convent and St. Bede's School in Mylapore, Chennai.

== See also ==
- Kovalam
- List of fishing villages
- Samudra yoga school
