= Ichapore =

ichapur Ishapore
- Neighbourhood
- Location in West Bengal, India ichapur (India)
- Coordinates: 22.81°N 88.37°E
- Country: India
- State: West Bengal
- Division: Presidency
- District: North 24 Parganas

Government
  - Type: Municipality
  - Body: North Barrackpur Municipality
- Elevation: 12 m (39 ft)

Languages
  - Official: Bengali, English
- Time zone: UTC+5:30 (IST)
- PIN: 743144
- Telephone code: +91 33
- Vehicle registration: WB
- Lok Sabha constituency: Barrackpore
- Vidhan Sabha constituency: Noapara
- Website: north24parganas.nic.in

Ichapur (also known as Ichhapur, Ishapore) is a neighbourhood in North Barrackpur of North 24 Parganas district in the Indian state of West Bengal. It is a part of the area covered by Kolkata Metropolitan Development Authority (KMDA).

== Geography ==
Cities and towns in the northern portion of Barrackpore subdivision in North 24 Parganas district
M: municipal city/ town, CT: census town,
N: neighbourhood, OG: outgrowth
Owing to space constraints in the small map, the actual locations in a larger map may vary slightly

=== Location ===
Ichapore is located at 22.81°N 88.37°E. It has an average elevation of 12 m (39 ft).

96% of the population of Barrackpore subdivision (partly presented in the map alongside) live in urban areas. In 2011, it had a density of population of 10,967 per km^{2} The subdivision has 16 municipalities and 24 census towns.

For most of the cities/ towns information regarding density of population is available in the Infobox. Population data is not available for neighbourhoods. It is available for the entire municipal area and thereafter ward-wise.

All places marked on the map are linked in the full-screen map.

Ichapore is not identified in 2011 census as a separate location and may have been included in some other location. In the Map of Barrackpore I CD Block on page 365 of District Census Handbook, Ichapore railway station and the entire area around Ichhapur Defence Estate is included in North Barrackpur municipality.

=== Post Office ===
Ichapur has a non-delivery sub post office, with PIN 743144 in the North Presidency Division of North 24 Parganas district in Calcutta region. Other post offices with the same PIN are the Metal and Steel Factory, Anandamath, Ichapur Nawabganj, PS Bureau, Ichapur Rifle Factory and Kantadhar.

== Economy ==
Ichhapur Defence Estate has two ordnance factories, the Rifle Factory Ishapore (RFI) and the Metal and Steel Factory (MSF) of the Ordnance Factories Board.
