= Pavia =

- Comune
- Città di Pavia
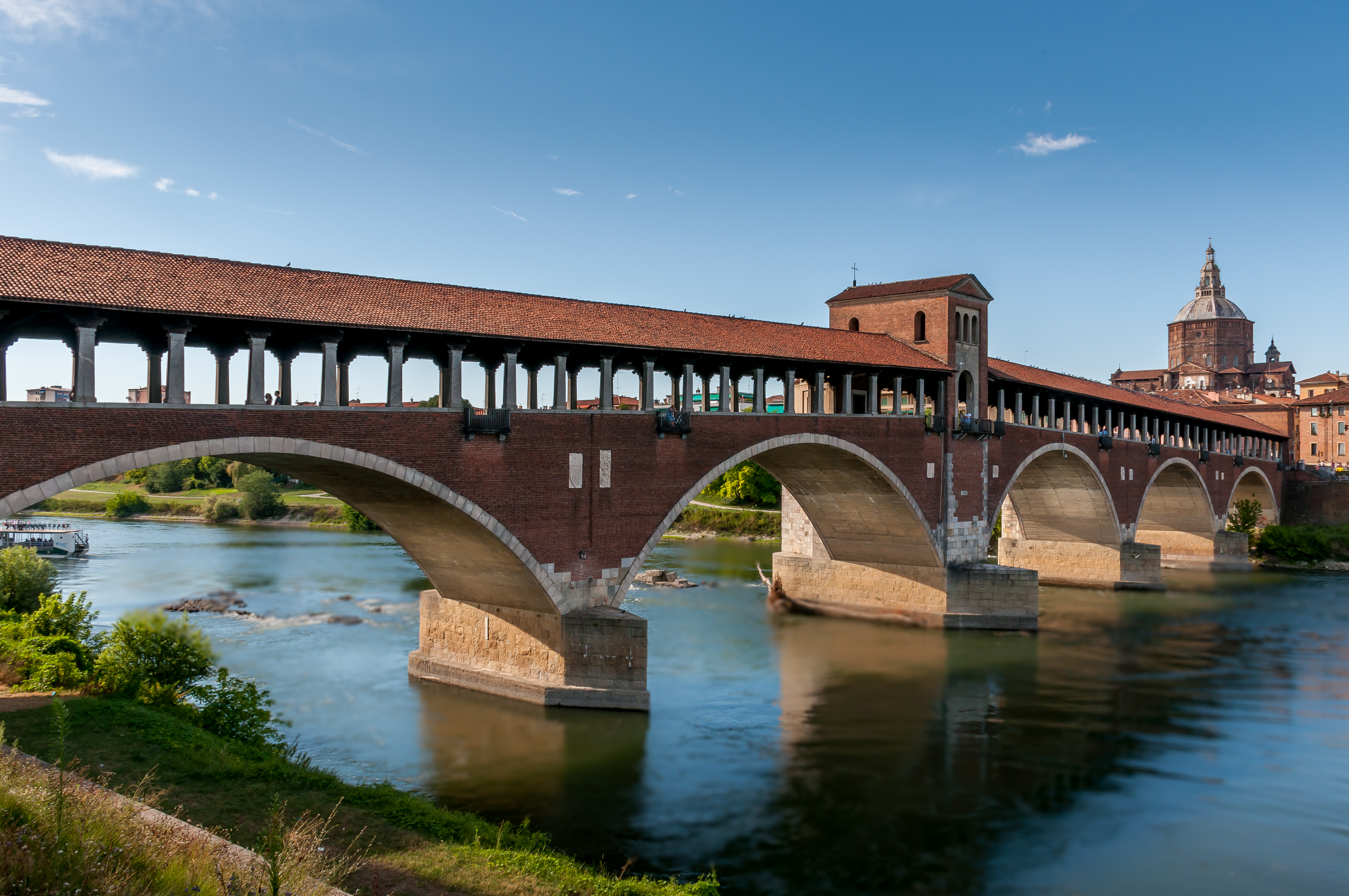
- Ponte Coperto and river Ticino

- Flag Coat of arms
- Nicknames: Seconda Roma (Italian: Second Rome), Città dalle cento torri (Italian: City of a hundred towers)
- Pavia within the Province of Pavia

- Location within Lombardy Location within Italy
- Coordinates: 45°11′06″N 09°09′15″E
- Country: Italy
- Region: Lombardy
- Province: Pavia (PV)
- Frazioni: Ca' della Terra, Cantone Tre Miglia, Cassinino, Cittadella, Fossarmato, Mirabello, Montebellino, Pantaleona, Prado, Scarpone, Villalunga

Government
  - Mayor: Michele Lissia (PD)

Area
  - Total: 62 km^{2} (24 sq mi)
- Elevation: 77 m (253 ft)

Population (30 June 2025)
  - Total: 71,646
  - Density: 1,200/km^{2} (3,000/sq mi)
- Demonym: Pavesi
- Time zone: UTC+1 (CET)
  - Summer (DST): UTC+2 (CEST)
- Postal code: 27100
- Dialing code: +39 0382
- ISTAT code: 018110
- Patron saint: Syrus of Pavia, Saint Augustine, Saint Theodore
- Saint day: 9 December, 28 August and 20 May
- Website: www.comune.pv.it

Pavia (UK: /ˈpɑːviə/ pah-VEE-ə, US: /pəˈviːə/ pə-VEE-ə; Italian: [paˈviːa]) is a town and comune in south-western Lombardy, Northern Italy, 35 kilometres (22 miles) south of Milan on the lower Ticino near its confluence with the Po. It has a population of about 73,086.

The city was a major political centre in the medieval period, being the capital of the Ostrogothic Kingdom from 540 to 553, the capital of the Kingdom of the Lombards from 572 to 774, the capital of the Kingdom of Italy from 774 to 1024 and the seat of the Visconti court from 1365 to 1413.

Pavia is the capital of the fertile province of Pavia, which is known for a variety of agricultural products, including wine, rice, cereals, and dairy products. Although there are a number of industries located in the suburbs, these tend not to disturb the peaceful atmosphere of the town. It is home to the ancient University of Pavia and several other universities, colleges and related institutions and the 15th-century Policlinico San Matteo. Pavia is the episcopal seat of the Roman Catholic Bishop of Pavia. There are many artistic and cultural treasures in the area, including several important churches and museums, such as the Certosa di Pavia. The municipality of Pavia is part of the Parco naturale lombardo della Valle del Ticino (a Nature reserve included by UNESCO in the World Network of Biosphere Reserves) and preserves two forests (Strict nature reserve Bosco Siro Negri and Bosco Grande nature reserve).

== Toponymy ==
In Roman times, Pavia was called Ticinum. It began to be called Papia, whence Pavia, only since Lombard times, one of the very few Roman municipia in Italy that changed their names during the early Middle Ages. The origin of the modern name is uncertain.

== History ==
=== Early history ===
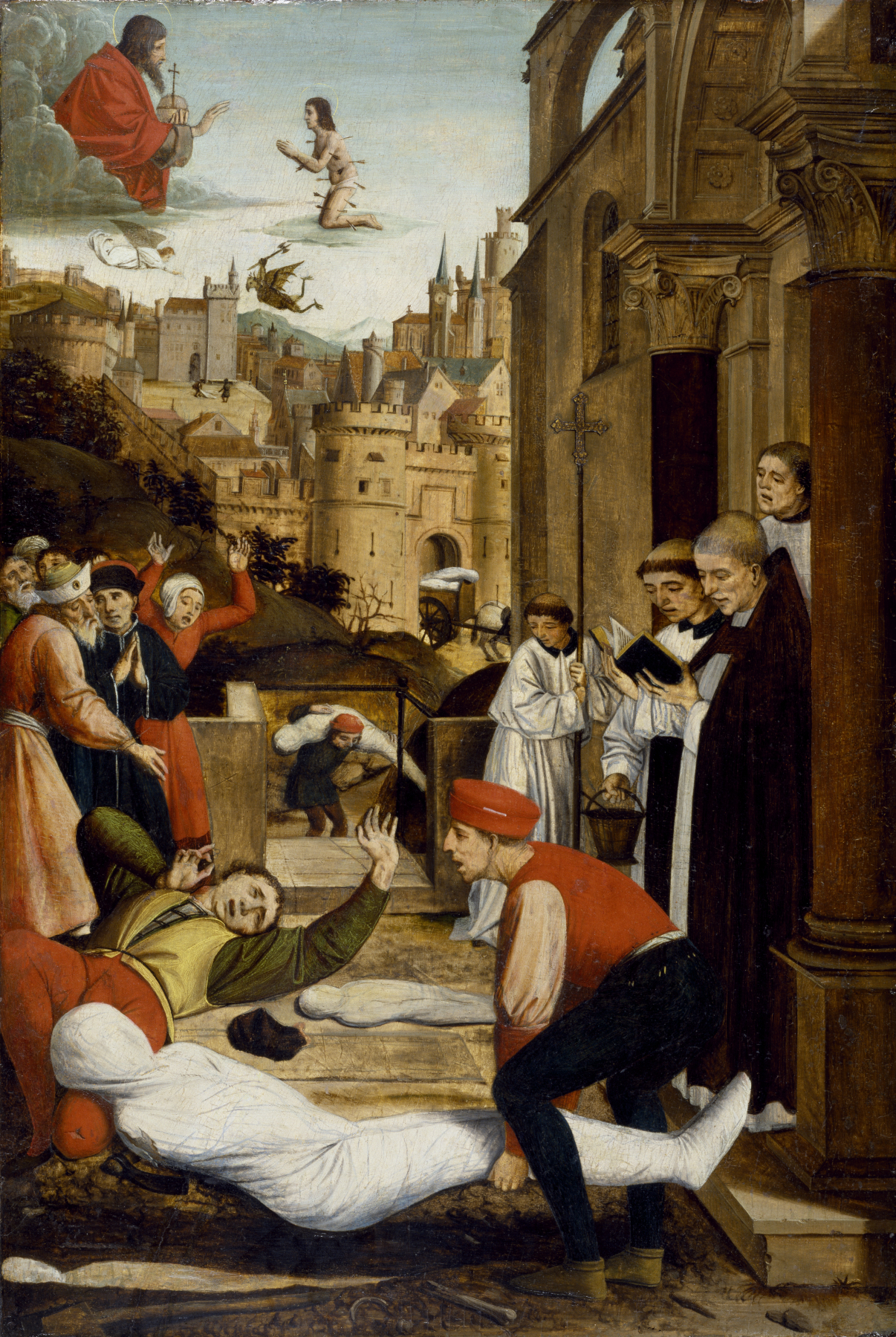
This painting by Josse Lieferinxe depicts an outbreak of the plague in seventh-century Pavia (then under the Lombard Kingdom). The Walters Art Museum.

Dating back to pre-Roman times, the town of Pavia was said by Pliny the Elder to have been founded by the Laevi and Marici, two Ligurian, or Celto-Ligurian, tribes, while Ptolemy attributes it to the Insubres, a Celtic population. The Roman city, known as Ticinum, was a municipality and an important military site (a castrum) under the Roman Empire. It most likely began as a small military camp built by the consul Publius Cornelius Scipio in 218 BCE to guard a wooden bridge he had built over the river Ticinum, on his way to search for Hannibal, who was rumoured to have managed to lead an army over the Alps and into Italy. The forces of Rome and Carthage ran into each other soon thereafter, and the Romans suffered the first of many crushing defeats at the hands of Hannibal, with the consul himself almost losing his life. The bridge was destroyed, but the fortified camp, which at the time was the most forward Roman military outpost in the Po Valley, somehow survived the long Second Punic War, and gradually evolved into a garrison town.

Its importance grew with the extension of the Via Aemilia from Ariminum (Rimini) to the river Po (187 BCE), which it crossed at Placentia (Piacenza) and there forked, one branch going to Mediolanum (Milan) and the other to Ticinum, and thence to Laumellum where it divided once more, one branch going to Vercellae – and thence to Eporedia and Augusta Praetoria – and the other to Valentia – and thence to Augusta Taurinorum (Turin).

The town was built on levelled ground with square blocks. The "cardo Maximus" road corresponded to the current Strada Nuova up to the Roman bridge while the "decumanus" road corresponded to corso Cavour-corso Mazzini. Under most of the streets of the historic center there are still the brick ducts of the Roman sewer system which continued to function throughout the Middle Ages and the modern age without interruption, until about 1970.

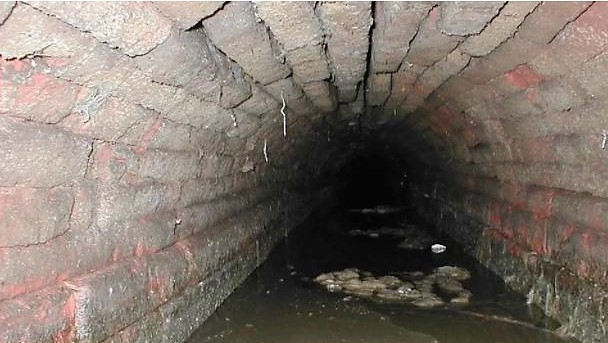
One of the sections of the Roman sewer that passes under the streets of the historic centre of Pavia

Pavia was important as a Military site (near the city, in 271, the emperor Aurelian defeated the Juthungi) because of the easy access to water communications (through the rivers Ticino and Po) up to the Adriatic Sea and because of its defence structures.

In 325 Martin of Tours came to Pavia as a child following his father, a Roman officer. Pavia was the seat of an important Roman mint between 273 and 326. In 452, Pavia was sacked by the Huns under Attila. The reign of Romulus Augustulus (r. 475–476), the last emperor of the Western Roman Empire ended at Pavia in 476 CE, and Roman rule thereby ceased in Italy. Romulus Augustulus, while considered the last emperor of the Western Roman Empire, was actually a usurper of the imperial throne; his father Flavius Orestes dethroned the previous emperor, Julius Nepos, and raised the young Romulus Augustulus to the imperial throne at Ravenna in 475. Though being the emperor, Romulus Augustulus was simply the mouthpiece for his father Orestes, who was the person who actually exercised power and governed Italy during Romulus Augustulus' short reign. Ten months after Romulus Augustulus's reign began, Orestes's soldiers under the command of one of his officers named Odoacer, rebelled and killed Orestes in the city of Pavia in 476. The rioting that took place as part of Odoacer's uprising against Orestes sparked fires that burnt much of Pavia to the point that Odoacer, as the new king of Italy, had to suspend the taxes for the city for five years so that it could finance its recovery. Without his father, Romulus Augustulus was powerless. Instead of killing Romulus Augustulus, Odoacer pensioned him off at 6,000 solidi a year before declaring the end of the Western Roman Empire and himself king of the new Kingdom of Italy.

Odoacer's reign as king of Italy did not last long, because in 488 the Ostrogothic peoples led by their king Theoderic invaded Italy and waged war against Odoacer. After fighting for 5 years, Theoderic defeated Odoacer and on 15 March 493, assassinated Odoacer at a banquet meant to negotiate a peace between the two rulers. With the establishment of the Ostrogoth kingdom based in northern Italy, Theoderic began his vast program of public building. Pavia was among several cities that Theodoric chose to restore and expand. He began the construction of the vast palace complex that would eventually become the residence of Lombard monarchs several decades later. Theoderic also commissioned the building of the Roman-styled amphitheatre and bath complex in Pavia; in the seventh century these would be among the few still functioning bath complexes in Europe outside of the Eastern Roman Empire. Near the end of Theoderic's reign the Christian philosopher Boethius was imprisoned in one of Pavia's churches from 522 to 525 before his execution for treason. It was during Boethius's captivity in Pavia that he wrote his seminal work the Consolation of Philosophy.

Ostrogothic belt buckle, Civic Museums

Pavia played an important role in the war between the Eastern Roman Empire and the Ostrogoths that began in 535. After the Eastern Roman general Belisarius's victory over the Ostrogothic leader Wittigis in 540 and the loss of most of the Ostrogoth lands in Italy, Pavia was among the last centres of Ostrogothic resistance that continued the war and opposed Eastern Roman rule. After the capitulation of the Ostrogothic leadership in 540 more than a thousand men remained garrisoned in Pavia and Verona dedicated to opposing Eastern Roman rule. Since 540 Pavia became the permanent capital of the Ostrogothic Kingdom, stable site of the court and the royal treasury. The resilience of Ostrogoth strongholds like Pavia against invading forces allowed pockets of Ostrogothic rule to limp along until finally being defeated in 561.

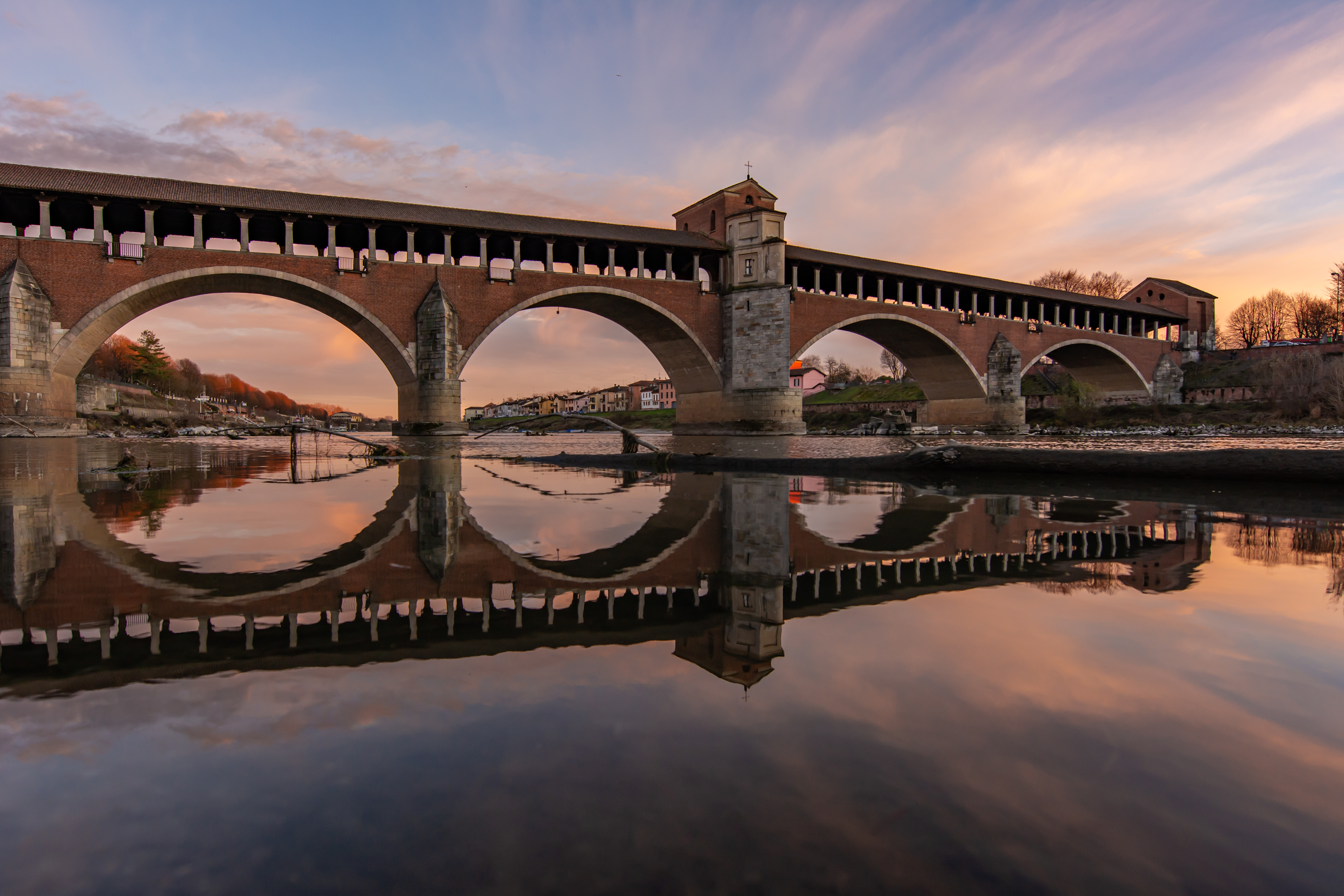
Ponte Coperto

Pavia and the peninsula of Italy did not remain long under the rule of the Eastern Roman Empire, for in 568 CE a new people invaded Italy: the Lombards (otherwise called the Longobards). In their invasion of Italy in 568, the Lombards were led by their king Alboin (r. 560–572), who would become the first Lombard king of Italy. Alboin captured much of northern Italy in 568 but his progress was halted in 569 by the fortified city of Pavia. Paul the Deacon's History of the Lombards written more than a hundred years after the Siege of Ticinum provides one of the few records of this period: "The city of Ticinum (Pavia) at this time held out bravely, withstanding a siege more than three years, while the army of the Langobards remained close at hand on the western side. Meanwhile, Alboin, after driving out the soldiers, took possession of everything as far as Tuscany except Rome and Ravenna and some other fortified places which were situated on the shore of the sea." The Siege of Ticinum finally ended with the Lombards capturing the city of Pavia in 572. Pavia's strategic location and the Ostrogoth palaces located within it would make Pavia by the 620s the main capital of the Lombards' Kingdom of Pavia and the main residence for the Lombard rulers.

=== Lombard capital ===
Under Lombard rule many monasteries, nunneries, and churches were built at Pavia by the devout Christian Lombard monarchs. Even though the first Lombard kings were Arian Christians, sources from the period such as Paul the Deacon have recorded that the Arian Lombards were very tolerant of their Catholic subjects' faith and that up to the 690s Arian and Catholic cathedrals coexisted in Pavia. Lombard kings, queens, and nobles would engage in building churches, monasteries, and nunneries as a method to demonstrate their piety and their wealth by extravagantly decorating these structures which in many cases would become the site of that person's tomb, as in the case of Grimoald (r. 662–671) who built San Ambrogio in Pavia and buried there after his death in 671.

Tombstones of King Cunipert, Civic Museums

Aripert I had the basilica of Santissimo Salvatore built in 657, which became the mausoleum of the kings of the Bavarian dynasty. Perctarit (r. 661–662, 672–688) and his son Cunicpert (r.679–700) built a nunnery and a church at Pavia during their reigns. Lombard churches were sometimes named after those who commissioned their construction, such as San Maria Theodota in Pavia. The monastery of San Michele alla Pusterla located at Pavia was the royal monastery of the Lombard kings.

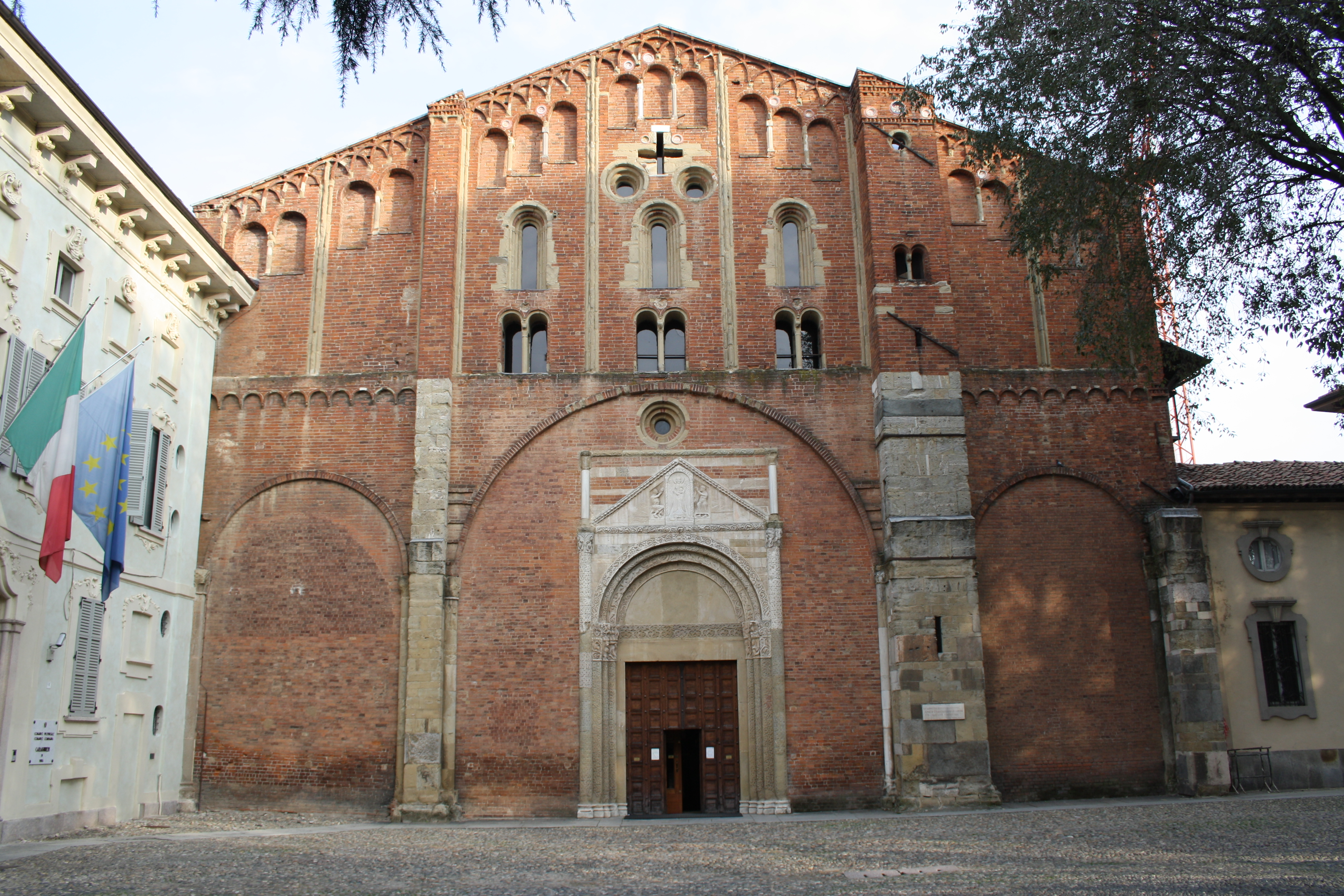
Basilica of San Pietro in Ciel d'Oro

church San Pietro in Ciel d'Oro was commissioned by a Lombard king in Pavia, Liutprand (r. 712–744) and it would become the site of his tomb as well as two other Christian figures. In building San Pietro in Ciel d'Oro the unit of measurement used by the builders was the length of Liutprand's royal foot. The first important Christian figure interred at San Pietro in Ciel d'Oro was the previously mentioned philosopher Boethius, author of The Consolation of Philosophy, who is located in the cathedral's crypt. The third and largest tomb of the three located in San Pietro in Ciel d'Oro contains the remains of St. Augustine of Hippo. St. Augustine is the early fifth-century Christian writer from Roman North Africa whose works such as On Christian Doctrine revolutionized the way in which the Christian scripture is interpreted and understood. On 1 October 1695, artisans working in San Pietro in Ciel d'Oro rediscovered St. Augustine's remains after lifting up some of the paving stones that compose the cathedral's floor. Liutprand was a very devout Christian and like many of the Lombard kings was zealous about collecting relics of saints. Liutprand paid a great deal to have the relics removed from Cagliari and brought to Pavia so that they would be out of the reach and safe from the Saracens on Sardinia where St. Augustine's remains had been resting. Very little of Liutprand's original church of San Pietro in Ciel d'Oro consecrated by Pope Zacharias in 743 remains today. Originally the roof of its apse was decorated with mosaics, making San Pietro in Ciel d'Oro the first instance of mosaics being used to decorate a Lombard church. It is now a modern church with the only significant link to its antiquity being its round apse. The Lombards built their churches in a very Romanesque style, with the best example of Lombard churches from the period of Lombardic rule being the Basilica of San Michele still intact at Pavia.

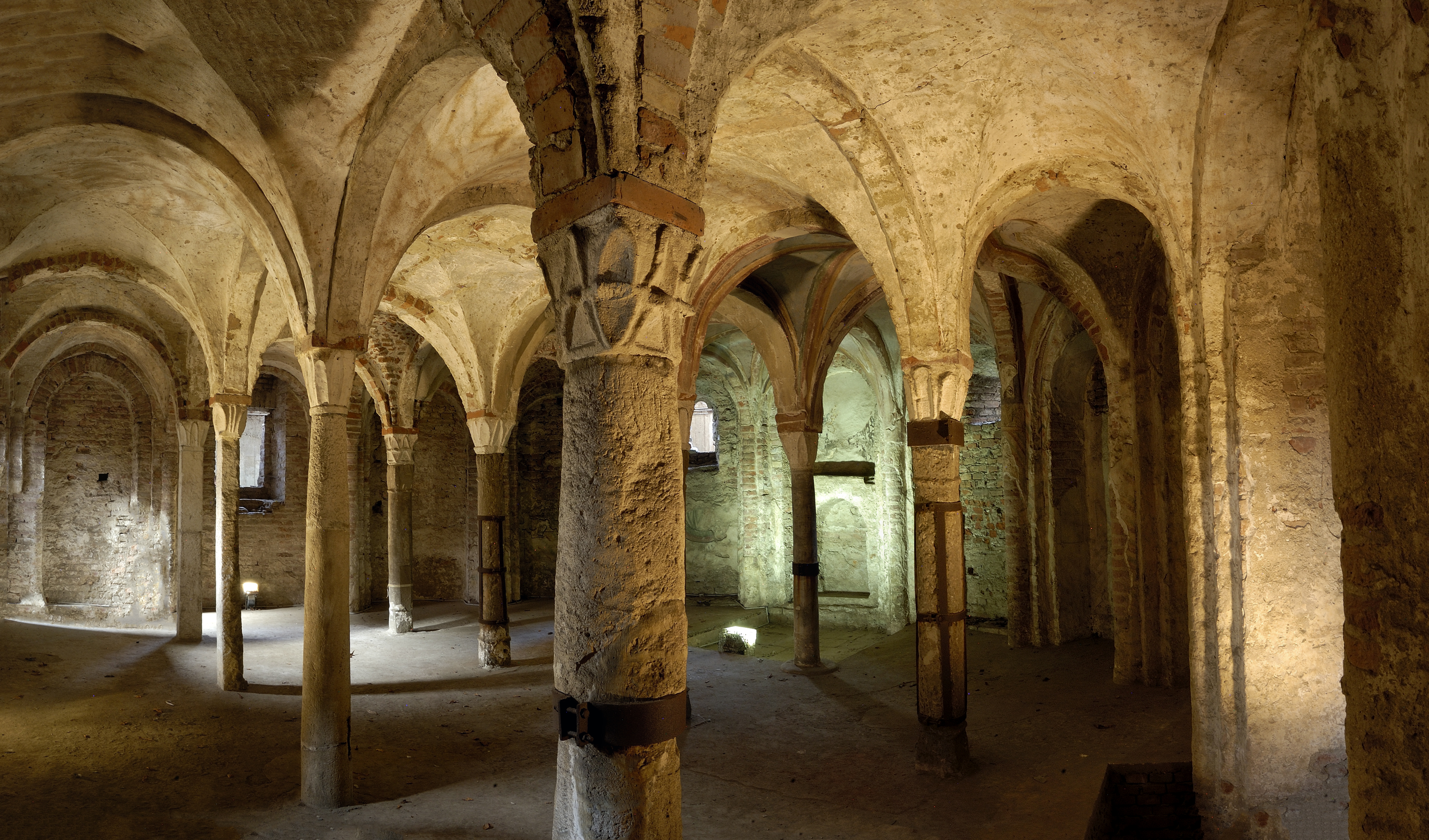
Crypt of Sant'Eusebio

As the kingdom's capital, Pavia in the late seventh century also became one of the central locations of the Lombards' efforts to mint their own coinage. The bust of the Lombard king would have been etched on the coins as a symbolic gesture so that those who used the coins, mostly Lombard nobles, would understand that king had the ultimate power and control of wealth in the Kingdom of Pavia. The role of the capital implies the residence of the royal court, the presence of the central administrative structure of the kingdom, and the city's pre-eminence over the other urban centres in the military organization of the seasonal wars. The city of Pavia played a key role in the war between the Lombard Kingdom of Pavia and the Franks led by Charlemagne. In 773, Charlemagne king of the Franks declared war and invaded across the Alps into northern Italy defeating the Lombard army commanded by king Desiderius (r. 757–774). Between the autumn of 773 and June of 774 Charlemagne laid siege to Pavia first and then Verona, capturing the seat of Lombard power and quickly crushing any resistance from the northern Lombard fortified cities. Pavia had been the official capital of the Lombards since the 620s, but it was also the place upon where the Lombard Kingdom in Italy ended. Upon entering Pavia in triumph, Charlemagne crowned himself king of the lands of the former Kingdom of Pavia. The Lombard kingdom and its northern territories from then onwards were a sub-kingdom of the Frankish Empire, while the Lombard southern duchy of Benevento persisted for several centuries longer with relative independence and autonomy.

There is little information, but, again in the eighth century, a Jewish community was also present in Pavia: Alcuin of York recalls a religious disputation that took place in the city between 750 and 766 between the Jew Julius of Pavia and the Christian Peter of Pisa.

=== Medieval history ===
Emperor Lothair I, king of Italy from 822 to 850, paid attention to schools when in 825 he issued his capitulary by means of which he prescribed that students from many towns of north Italy had to attend the lectures in the school of Pavia.

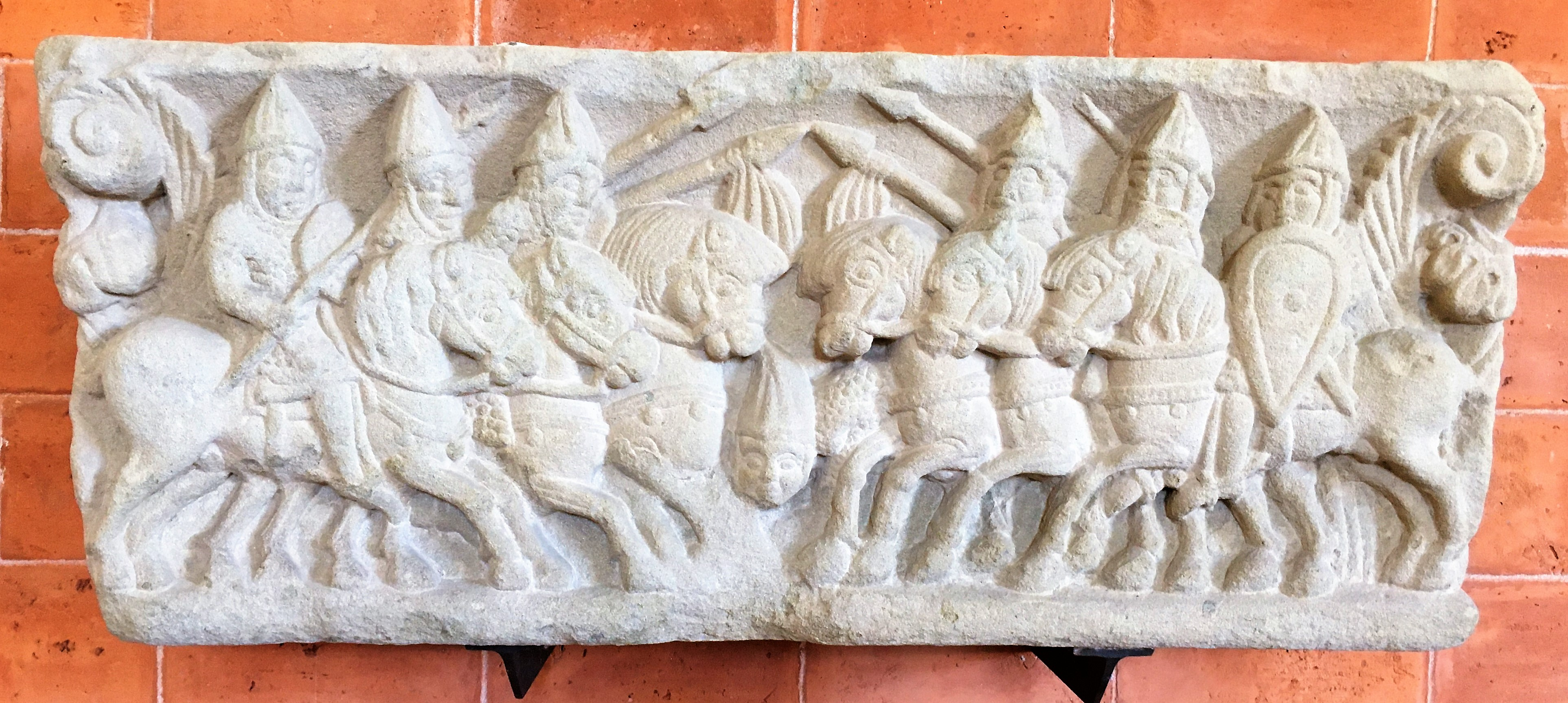
Capital with battle scene, 12th century, Civic Museums

In 924, the Hungarians, led by the deposed Lombard king, Berengar I, besieged but did not conquer the city. With Otto II Pavia become the stable site of the court, first with queen Adelaide of Italy and then with the wife of Otto II Theophanum. During the Ottonian period Pavia enjoyed a period of well-being and development. The ancient Lombard capital distinguished itself from the other cities of the Po Valley for its fundamental function as a crossroads of important trade, both in foodstuffs and in luxury items. Commercial traffic was favored above all by the waterways used by the emperor for his travels: from Ticino the Po was easily reached, a direct axis with the Adriatic Sea and maritime traffic. Furthermore, with the advent of the Ottoni, Milan again lost importance in favor of Pavia, whose pre-eminence was sanctioned, among other things, by the minting of the Pavia mint. The importance of the city in those centuries is also highlighted by the account of the Arab geographer Ibrāhīm al-Turtuši, who traveled to central-western Europe between 960 and 965 and visited Verona, Rocca di Garda and Pavia, which he defined the main city of Longobardia, very populous, rich in merchants and entirely built, unlike other centers in the region, in stone, brick and lime. In Pavia, Ibrāhīm al-Turtuši, was very impressed by the equestrian statue of Regisole, which he places near one of the doors of the Royal palace and by the 300 jurists working inside the palace. Also at the turn of the tenth and eleventh centuries, the city was the birthplace of Liutprand of Cremona, bishop, chronicler and diplomat in the service of Berengar II first and then of Otto I and Otto II and of Lanfranc, a close collaborator of William the Conqueror and, after the Norman conquest of the Anglo-Saxon kingdom, reorganizer of the English church. Pavia remained the capital of the Italian Kingdom and the centre of royal coronations until the diminution of imperial authority there in the 12th century. In 1004, Holy Roman Emperor Henry II bloodily suppressed a revolt of the citizens of Pavia, who disputed his recent coronation as King of Italy.

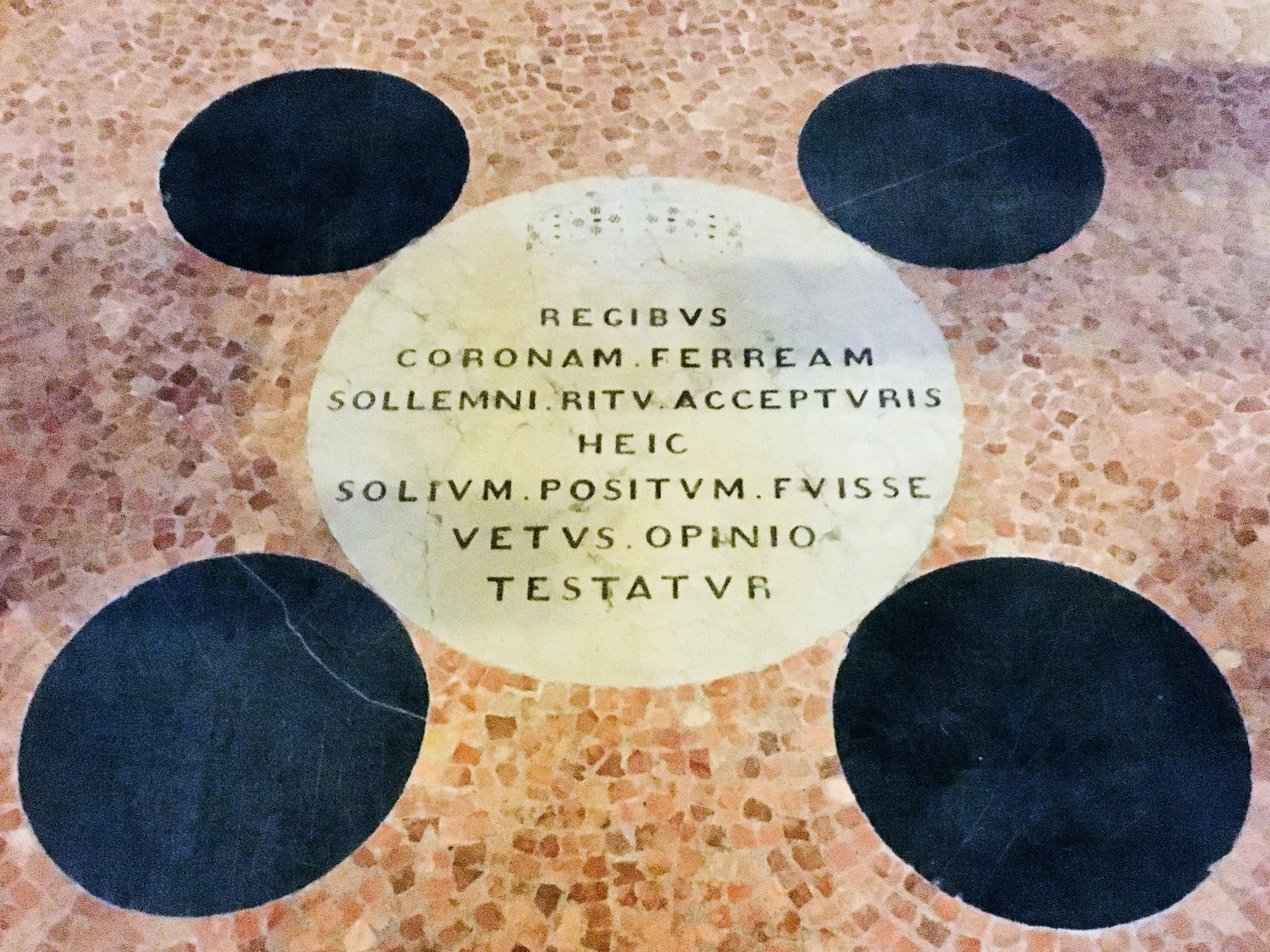
Basilica of San Michele Maggiore, the five stones, already mentioned in the Honorantiae civitatis Papiae (about 1020), above which the throne was placed during coronations

In 1018, Pope Benedict VIII convened a council in Pavia, at which the condemnation of simony and of clerical concubinage was reaffirmed. A new council, also convened by Pope Benedict VIII and Emperor Henry II, was held in Pavia in 1022 and established severe measures to suppress Nicolaitism and simony. In 1037, Emperor Conrad II, together with the army of Pavia, laid siege to Milan, although the siege was later lifted, and the devastation of the Milanese fields continued until 1039. The rivalry between Pavia and Milan turned into a war in 1056, which continued for a long time with changing fortunes (Battle of Campomorto, 1061), and Pavia called upon the emperor for assistance. In 1076, during the conflicts between Emperor Henry IV and Pope Gregory VII, the imperial-loyal bishops organized a council in Pavia, at which Pope Gregory VII was excommunicated. In the 12th century, Pavia acquired the status of a self-governing commune. In the political division between Guelphs and Ghibellines that characterized the Italian Middle Ages, Pavia was traditionally Ghibelline, a position that was as much supported by the rivalry with Milan as it was a mark of the defiance of the Emperor that led the Lombard League against the emperor Frederick Barbarossa, who was attempting to reassert long-dormant Imperial influence over Italy. Frederick I celebrated two coronations in Pavia (1155 and 1162) in the basilica of San Michele Maggiore and resided in a new imperial palace near the royal monastery of St. Salvatore.

In the following centuries Pavia was an important and active town. Pavia supported the emperor Frederick II against the Lombard League and the Pavese army took part in numerous operations in the service of the emperor and participated in the battle of Cortenuova in 1237.

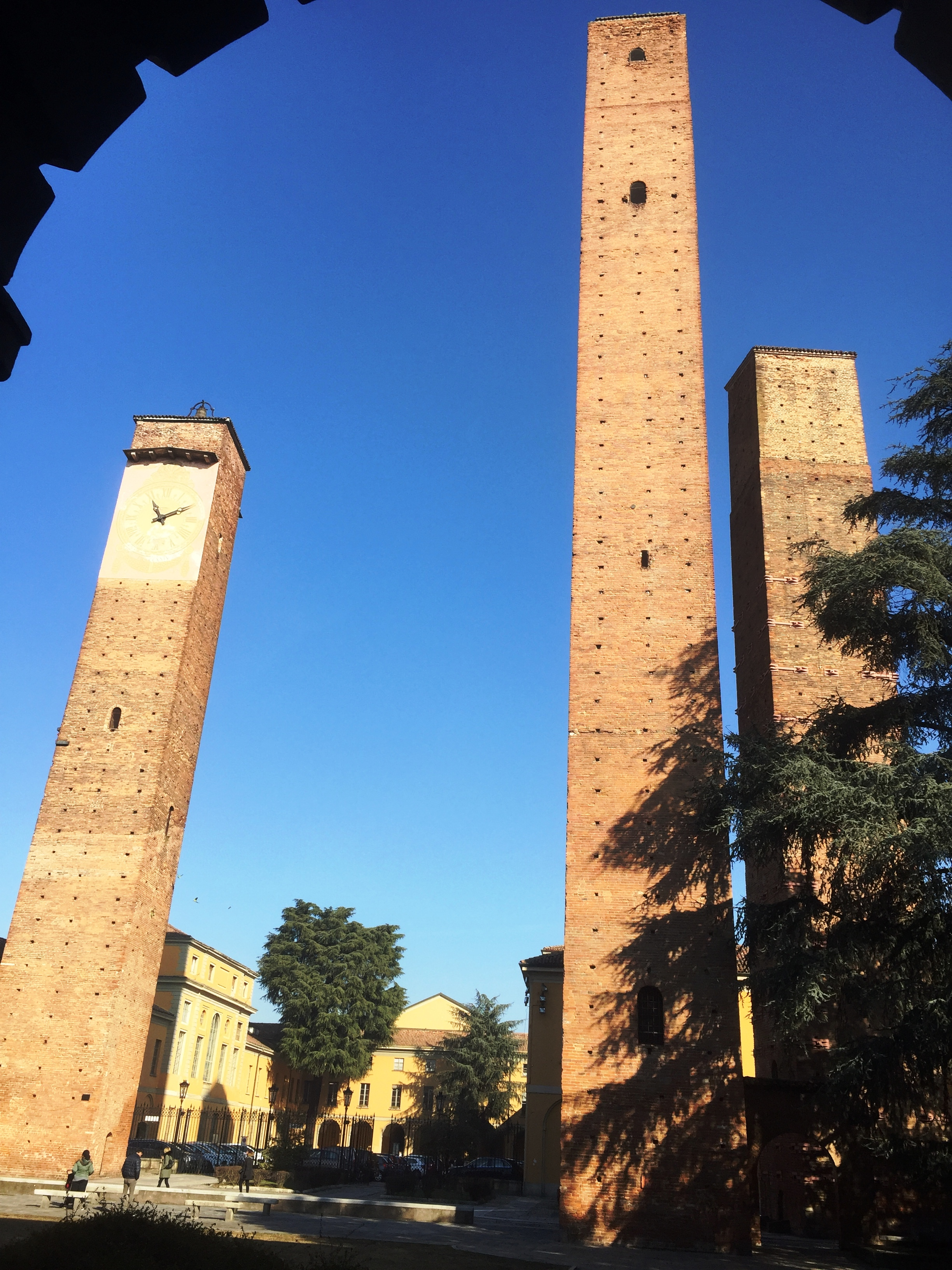
Some of the Towers of Pavia, 11th–13th century

Under the Treaty of Pavia, Emperor Louis IV granted during his stay in Italy the Electorate of the Palatinate to his brother Duke Rudolph's descendants. Pavia held out against the domination of Milan, finally yielding to the Visconti family, rulers of that city in 1359 after a difficult siege; under the Visconti Pavia became an intellectual and artistic centre, being the seat from 1361 of the University of Pavia founded around the nucleus of the old school of law, which attracted students from many countries. During the regency of Galeazzo II and Gian Galeazzo the memory of the capital's role and the Lombard traditions of Pavia jointly entered the "propaganda" of the new masters of Pavia: Galeazzo II moved his court from Milan to Pavia and between 1361 and 1365 Galeazzo II built a large palace (Visconti castle) with a major Park (Visconti Park), which became the official residence of the dynasty. In 1396 Gian Galeazzo commissioned the building of the Certosa, built at the end of the Visconti Park, which connected the Certosa to the castle of Pavia. The church, the last edifice of the complex to be built, was to be the family mausoleum of the Visconti. In 1389, by the will of Gian Galeazzo Visconti, some families of German Jews settled in Pavia, mainly active in financial activities. The Jewish community of Pavia grew in the 15th century, when Elijah ben Shabbetai, personal doctor of Filippo Maria Visconti and professor at the University of Pavia and, above all, Joseph Colon Trabotto, who was a 15th-century rabbi who is considered Italy's foremost Judaic scholar and Talmudist of his era, and in the same university a Hebrew course was activated in 1490. Also in the fifteenth century, by the will of the Dukes of Milan, the University of Pavia experienced a phase of great development: it began to attract students from both Italy and other European countries and taught teachers of great fame, such as Baldo degli Ubaldi, Lorenzo Valla or Giasone del Maino.

=== Early modern ===
The Battle of Pavia (1525) marked a watershed in the city's fortunes, since by that time, the former schism between the supporters of the Pope and those of the Holy Roman Emperor had shifted to one between a French party (allied with the Pope) and a party supporting the Emperor and King of Spain Charles V. Thus, during the Valois-Habsburg Italian Wars, Pavia was naturally on the Imperial (and Spanish) side. The defeat and capture of King Francis I of France during the battle ushered in a period of Spanish occupation. In the same years, Girolamo Cardano studied at the University of Pavia, while, probably in 1511, Leonardo da Vinci studied anatomy together with Marcantonio della Torre, professor of anatomy at the university. In 1597, by the will of Philip II of Spain, the Jewish community of Pavia had to abandon the city.

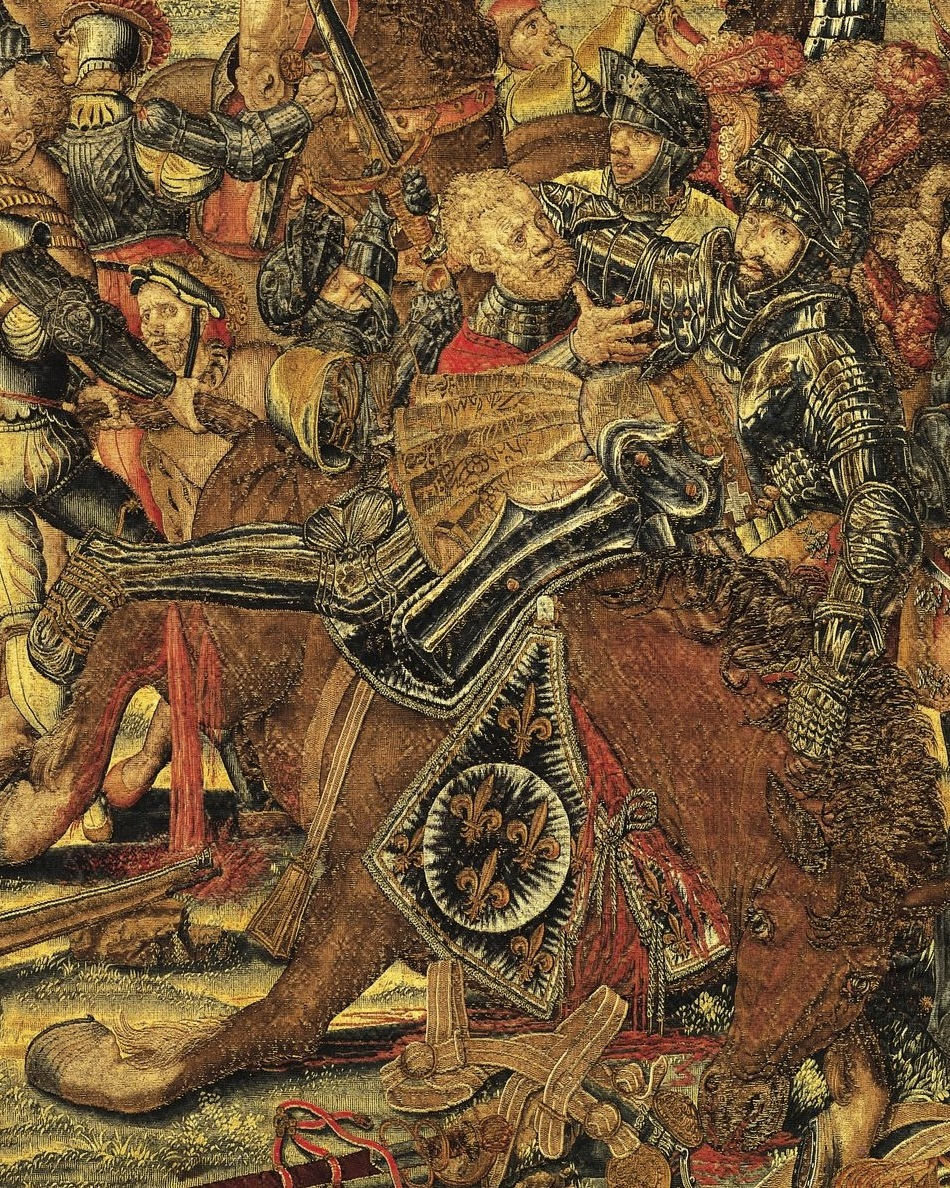
The capture of Francis I during the battle of Pavia, detail, one of a tapestry suite woven at Brussels c 1528–31 after cartoons by Bernard van Orley

During the Franco-Spanish war, Pavia was besieged from 24 July to 14 September 1655 by a large French, Savoyard and Estense army commanded by Thomas Francis, prince of Carignano, but the besiegers were unable to conquer the city. The Spanish period ended in 1706, when Pavia was occupied, after a short siege, by the Austrians led by Wirich Philipp von Daun during the War of the Spanish Succession and the city remained Austrian until 1796, when it was occupied by the French army under Napoleon. During this Austrian period the university was greatly supported by Maria Theresa of Austria and oversaw a culturally rich period due to the presence of leading scientists and humanists like Ugo Foscolo, Alessandro Volta, Lazzaro Spallanzani, and Camillo Golgi, among others. In 1796, after the Jacobins demolished Regisole (a bronze classical equestrian monument), the inhabitants of Pavia revolted against the French and the revolt was quelled by Napoleon after a furious urban fight.

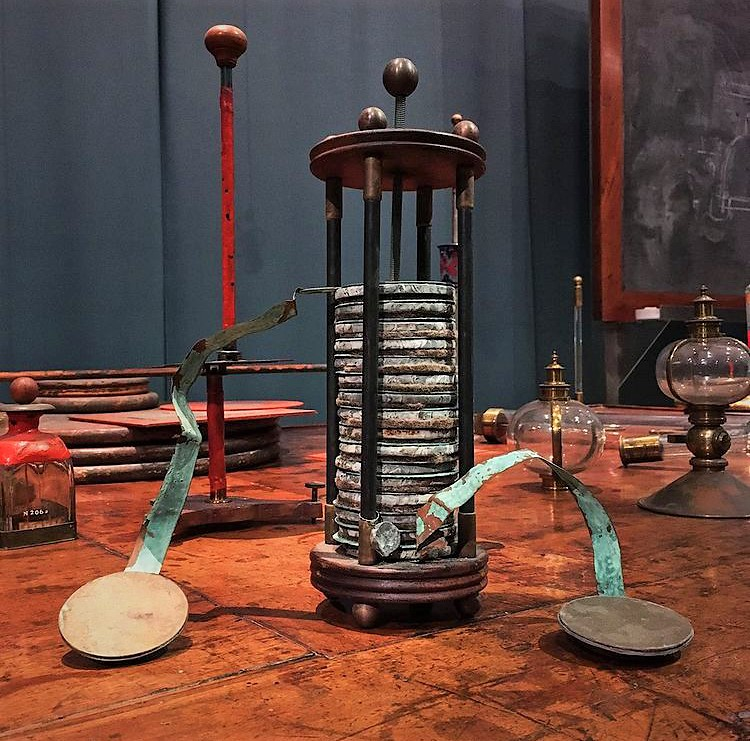
Voltaic pile, University History Museum of the University of Pavia

=== Modern History ===
In 1814, it again came under Austrian administration. In 1818 the works on the Naviglio Pavese were completed: the canal, conceived as a waterway between Milan, Pavia and Ticino and as an irrigation canal, contributed to the development of the city, so much so that a few years after its construction, in 1821, Borgo Calvenzano was built behind the Visconti Castle, a long series of arcaded buildings where there were warehouses, taverns, shipping and customs offices, hotels, stables, all in support of inland navigation. In 1820 the first steamships began to operate in the Pavia dock and, between 1854 and 1859, the Österreichischer Lloyd organized a regular navigation line, again using steamships, between Pavia, Venice and Trieste. With the Second War of Italian Independence (1859) and the unification of Italy one year later, Pavia passed, together with the rest of Lombardy, to the Kingdom of Italy. In 1894 Albert Einstein's father Hermann moved to Pavia to start a business supplying electrical materials, the Einstein. The Einsteins lived in the city in the same building (Palazzo Cornazzani) where Ugo Foscolo and Ada Negri had lived. While living in Pavia, Hermann Einstein applied for the discharge of his son Albert's citizenship in the Kingdom of Württemberg. Granted on January 28, 1896—just six weeks before Albert turned 17, the release legally allowed him to avoid compulsory military service. The young Albert came to the family several times between 1895 and 1896 and continued visiting the Marangoni family until 1900, where he stayed in a little house adjoining their splendid villa in Casteggio during his vacations in the grape harvest season. During his time in Italy he wrote a short essay with the title "On the Investigation of the State of the Ether in a Magnetic Field".

In 1943 Pavia was occupied by the German army. In September 1944, the US air forces carried out several bombings on the city with the aim of destroying the three bridges over the Ticino, strategic for supplying men. Weapons and provisions the German units engaged along the Gothic line. These operations led to the destruction of the Ponte Coperto and resulted in the deaths of 119 civilians.

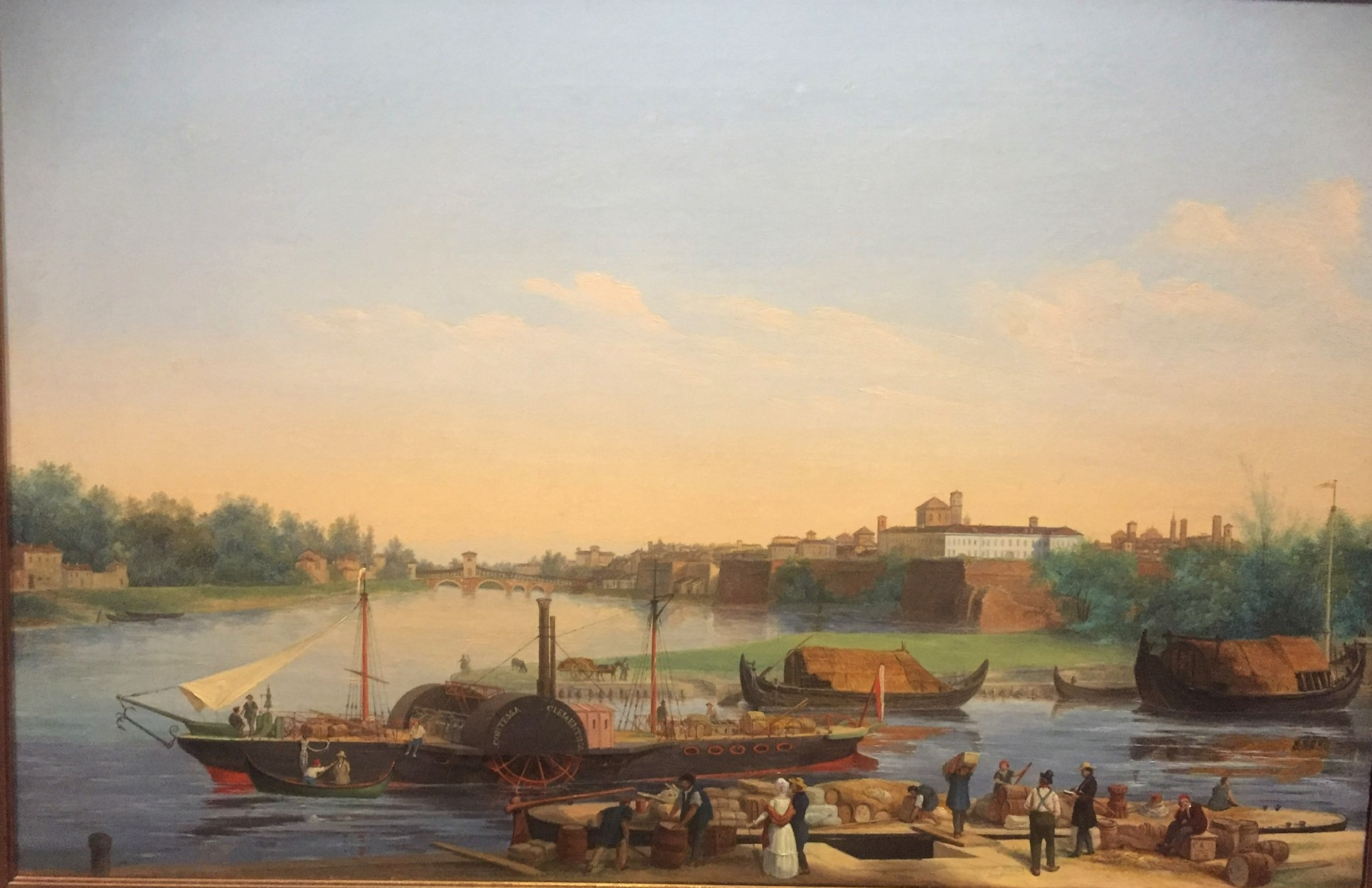
The port at the confluence of the Naviglio Pavese in Ticino with the steamship Countess Clementine, around 1859, Pavia Civic Museums

Allied troops entered the city on 30 April 1945. At the institutional referendum of 2 June 1946 Pavia assigned 67.1% of the votes to the Republic, while the monarchy obtained only 38.2%.

=== Symbols ===
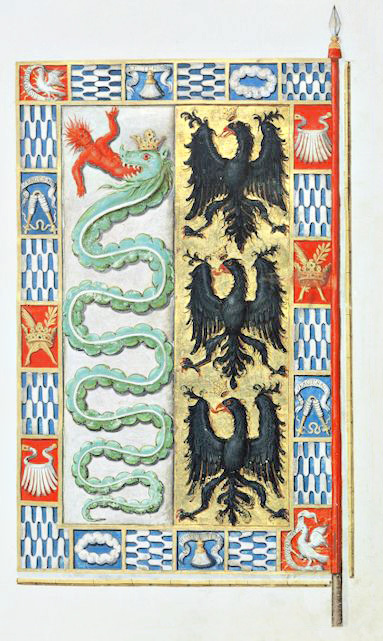
Coat of Arms of the county of Pavia under the Visconti Dynasty

The symbols of Pavia are the coat of arms, the banner and the seal, as reported in the municipal statute. The banner used by the modern city of Pavia faithfully reproduces the one used by the municipality of Pavia at least since the 13th century: a red banner with a white cross. This symbol, probably derived from blutfahne, the original flag of the emperor of the Holy Roman Empire, had a clear political meaning: to underline Pavia's belonging to the Ghibelline faction. The coat of arms of the municipality also depicts the cross which, starting from the end of the 16th century, began to be represented in an oval shape and within a rich frame, on top of which there is a mask with a crown count and often flanked by two angels holding the shield and the letters CO-PP (Comunitas Papie). The seal of the municipality depicts the Regisole, an ancient late antique bronze equestrian statue originally placed inside the Royal Palace and, probably in the 11th century, placed in the cathedral square. The statue was pulled down by the Jacobins in 1796.

== Geography ==
=== Topography ===
The Pavia municipality falls in the orographic system of the Po Valley formed after the alluvial filling of the wide of the gulf occupied by the Adriatic Sea before the Quaternary. A large part of the historic city center is located on the edge of the river Ticino.

The city occupies an area of 62.86 km^{2} (24.27 sq mi) west of Lombardy, located along the so-called "Karst spring's belt", where there is the meeting, in the subsoil, between geological layers with different permeability, an aspect that allows the deep waters to resurface on the surface.

The fluvial terrace on which Pavia stands appears engraved by two deep furrows due to the erosive action of two postglacial rivers, represented today by the Navigliaccio (originally occupied by the Calvenza) and by the Vernavola. The two valleys tend to converge just behind the area of the ancient city, so that primitive Pavia found itself on an almost isolated and difficult to reach trunk or stump of terrace, almost triangular in shape, which Ticino had to the south, the Calvenza and then the Navigliaccio to the north-west and the Vernavola to the north-east.

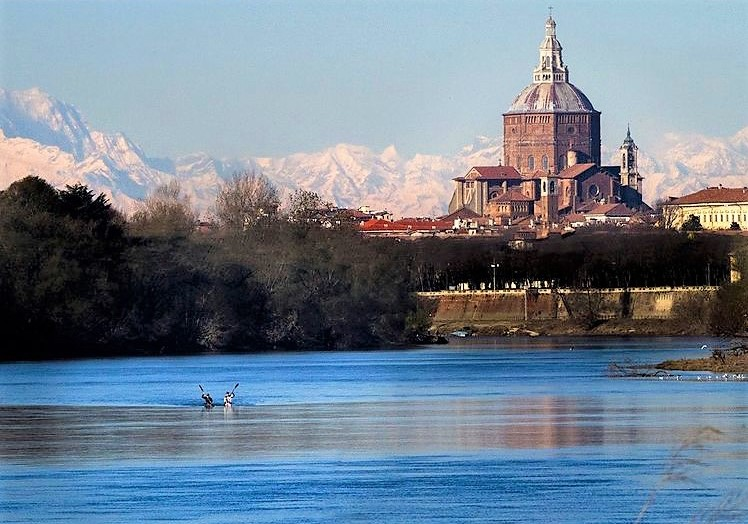
Ticino downstream from the city, in the background, behind the dome of the cathedral, the Monte Rosa

From an elevation point of view, the city has various heights. The highest point is located in the area of the Visconti Castle, about 80 m (260 ft) above sea level, and then slowly declines. From an altitude of 80 m (260 ft), you pass to 77 m (253 ft) in about 500 m (550 yd; 1,600 ft). Downstream from Piazza Vittoria, where the cardo and decumanus of the Roman city crossed, the slope becomes more pronounced, up to just under 60 m (200 ft) above sea level near the Ponte Coperto.

The humidity of the area is quite high (75–80% is the annual average), and this causes the typical fog, starting mainly during late autumn and winter.

=== Climate ===
Climate data for Pavia (2002–2017)
Month	Jan	Feb	Mar	Apr	May	Jun	Jul	Aug	Sep	Oct	Nov	Dec	Year
Mean daily maximum °C (°F)	5.7 (42.3)	8.4 (47.1)	14.6 (58.3)	18.9 (66.0)	23.6 (74.5)	28.4 (83.1)	30.3 (86.5)	29.2 (84.6)	24.8 (76.6)	18.1 (64.6)	11.7 (53.1)	6.4 (43.5)	18.3 (65.0)
Daily mean °C (°F)	2.9 (37.2)	4.7 (40.5)	9.9 (49.8)	14.1 (57.4)	18.5 (65.3)	23.1 (73.6)	24.9 (76.8)	24.0 (75.2)	19.8 (67.6)	14.3 (57.7)	8.9 (48.0)	3.8 (38.8)	14.1 (57.3)
Mean daily minimum °C (°F)	0.1 (32.2)	1.1 (34.0)	5.2 (41.4)	9.4 (48.9)	13.4 (56.1)	17.9 (64.2)	19.4 (66.9)	18.7 (65.7)	14.9 (58.8)	10.4 (50.7)	6.0 (42.8)	1.3 (34.3)	9.8 (49.7)
Average precipitation mm (inches)	67 (2.6)	67 (2.6)	70 (2.8)	72 (2.8)	81 (3.2)	72 (2.8)	63 (2.5)	80 (3.1)	64 (2.5)	105 (4.1)	102 (4.0)	71 (2.8)	914 (35.8)
Average precipitation days (≥ 1.0 mm)	7	7	8	8	8	6	5	5	5	7	8	7	81
Mean monthly sunshine hours	95	120	170	195	225	260	305	270	205	155	95	90	2,185
Source 1: Climi e viaggi
Source 2: Istituto Superiore per la Protezione e la Ricerca Ambientale (precipitation 1951–1980)

== Main sights ==
The Certosa, or Carthusian monastery, founded in 1396 and located eight kilometres (5.0 miles) north of the city.

Among other notable structures are:

- Cathedral of Pavia (Duomo di Pavia): construction of the cathedral began in 1488, designed principally by Donato Bramante, Giovanni Antonio Amadeo, Gian Giacomo Dolcebuono; however, only by 1898 were the façade and the dome completed according to the original design. The central dome has an octagonal plan, stands 97 m (318 ft) high, and weighs some 20,000 tonnes (22,000 short tons).
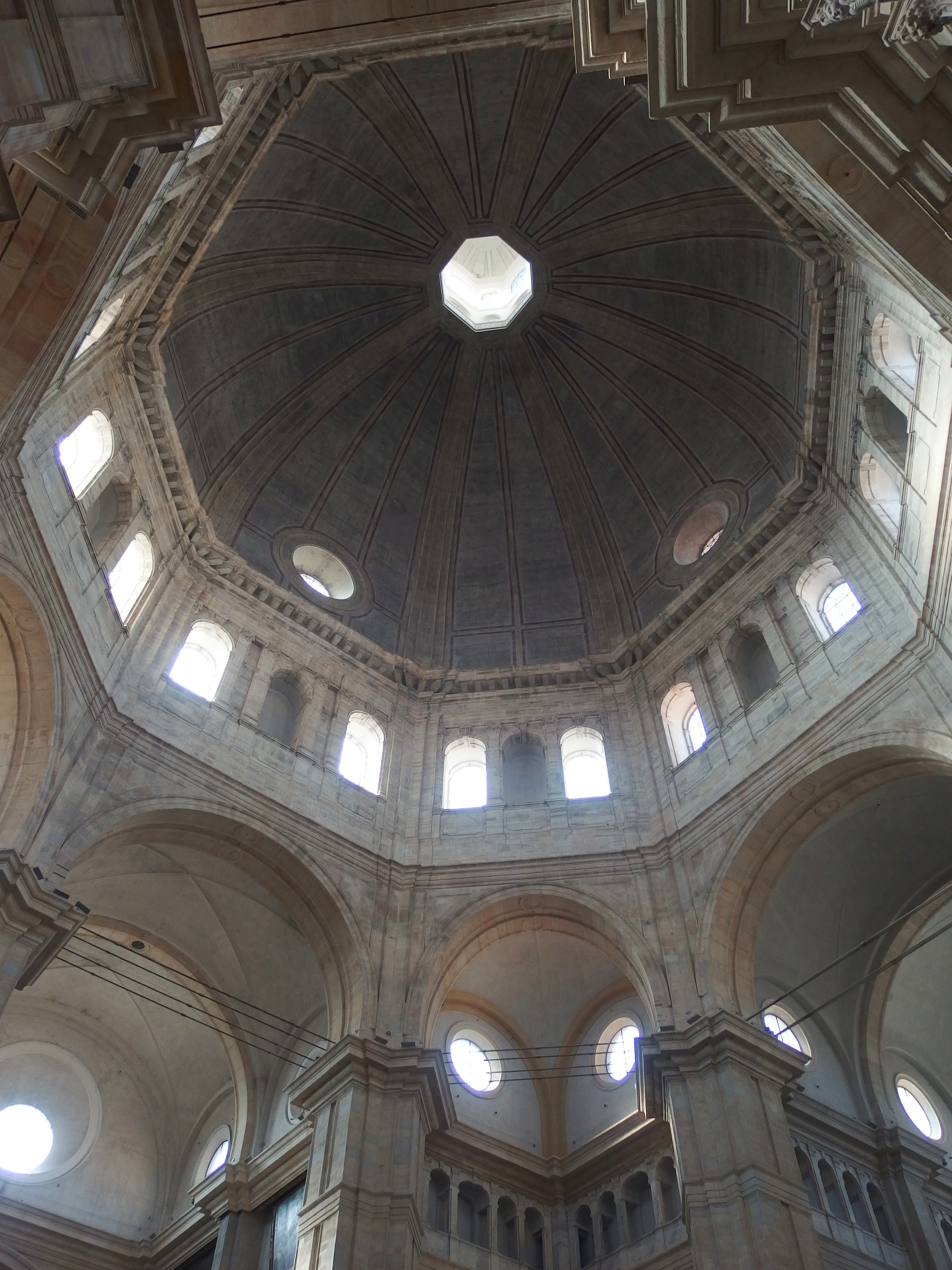
  The dome of the cathedral of Pavia
  This dome is the third for size in Italy, after St. Peter's Basilica and Santa Maria del Fiore in Florence. Next to the Duomo were the Civic Tower (existing at least from 1330 and enlarged in 1583 by Pellegrino Tibaldi): its fall on 17 March 1989, was the final motivating force that started the last decade's efforts to save the Leaning Tower of Pisa from a similar fate.

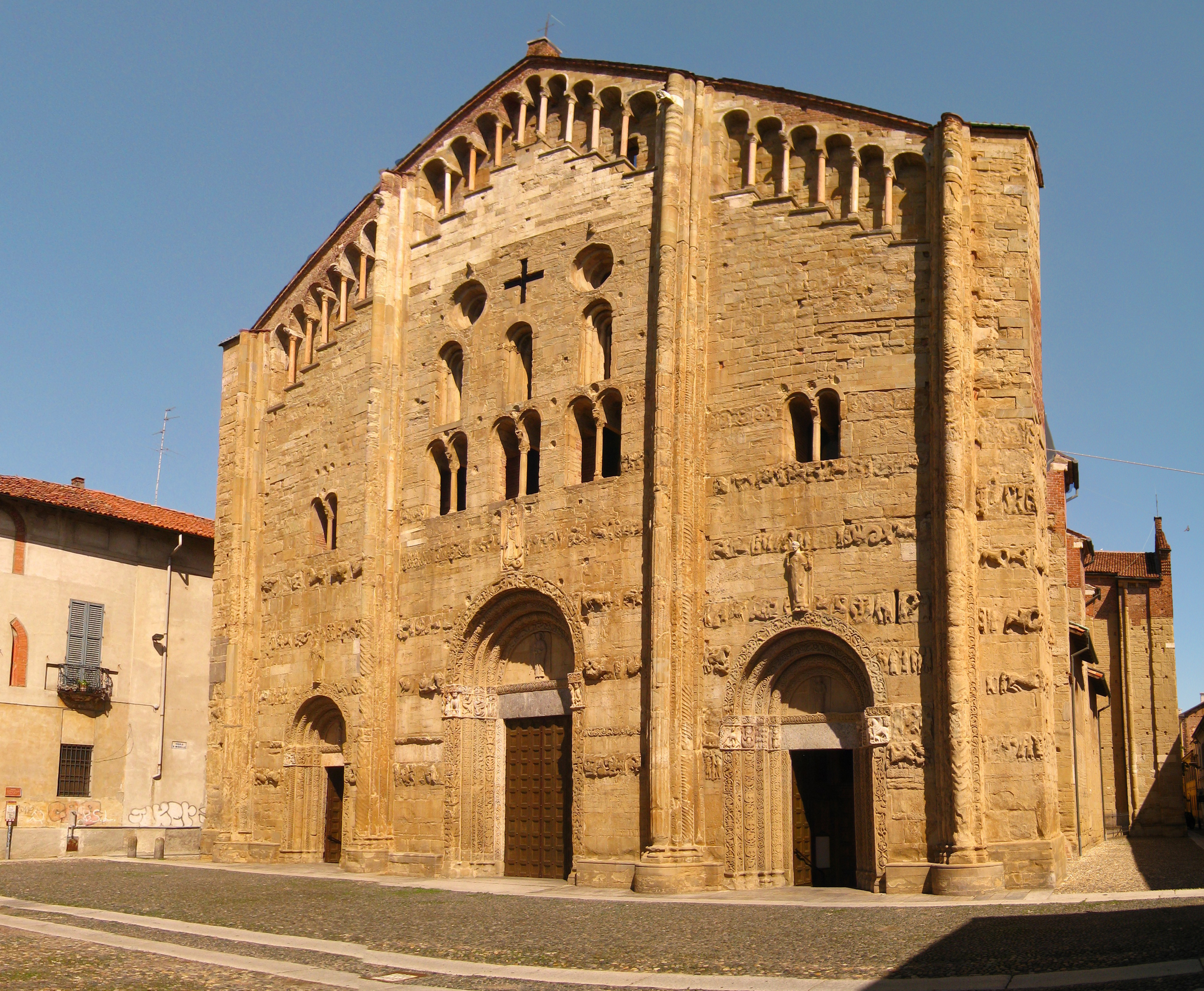
San Michele Maggiore, Pavia

- San Michele Maggiore (St. Michael Major): this church is an outstanding example of Lombard-Romanesque church architecture in Lombardy. It is located, near the Royal Palace, on the site of a pre-existing Lombard church, which the lower part of the campanile belongs to. The basilica was founded by King Grimoald between 662 and 671. Destroyed in 1004, it was rebuilt from around the end of the 11th century (including crypt, transept and choir), and finished in 1130. It is characterized by an extensive use of sandstone and by a very long transept, provided with a façade and an apse of its own.The basilica was the seat of numerous important events, including the coronations of Berengar I (888), Guy III (889), Louis III (900), Rudolph II (922), Hugh (926), Berengar II and his son Adalbert (950), Arduin (1002), Henry II (1004) and Frederick Barbarossa (1155).
- Basilica of San Pietro in Ciel d'Oro ("St. Peter in Golden Sky"): in this church, St Augustine, Boethius, and the Lombard king Liutprand are said to be buried. Construction was begun in the sixth century. The current construction was built in 1132. It is similar to San Michele Maggiore, but different in the asymmetric façade with a single portal, the use of brickwork instead of sandstone, and, in the interior, the absence of matronei, galleries reserved for women and the shortest transept. The noteworthy arch housing the relics of St. Augustine was built in 1362 by artists from Campione, and is decorated by some 150 statues and reliefs. The church is mentioned by Dante Alighieri in the X canto of his Divine Comedy.

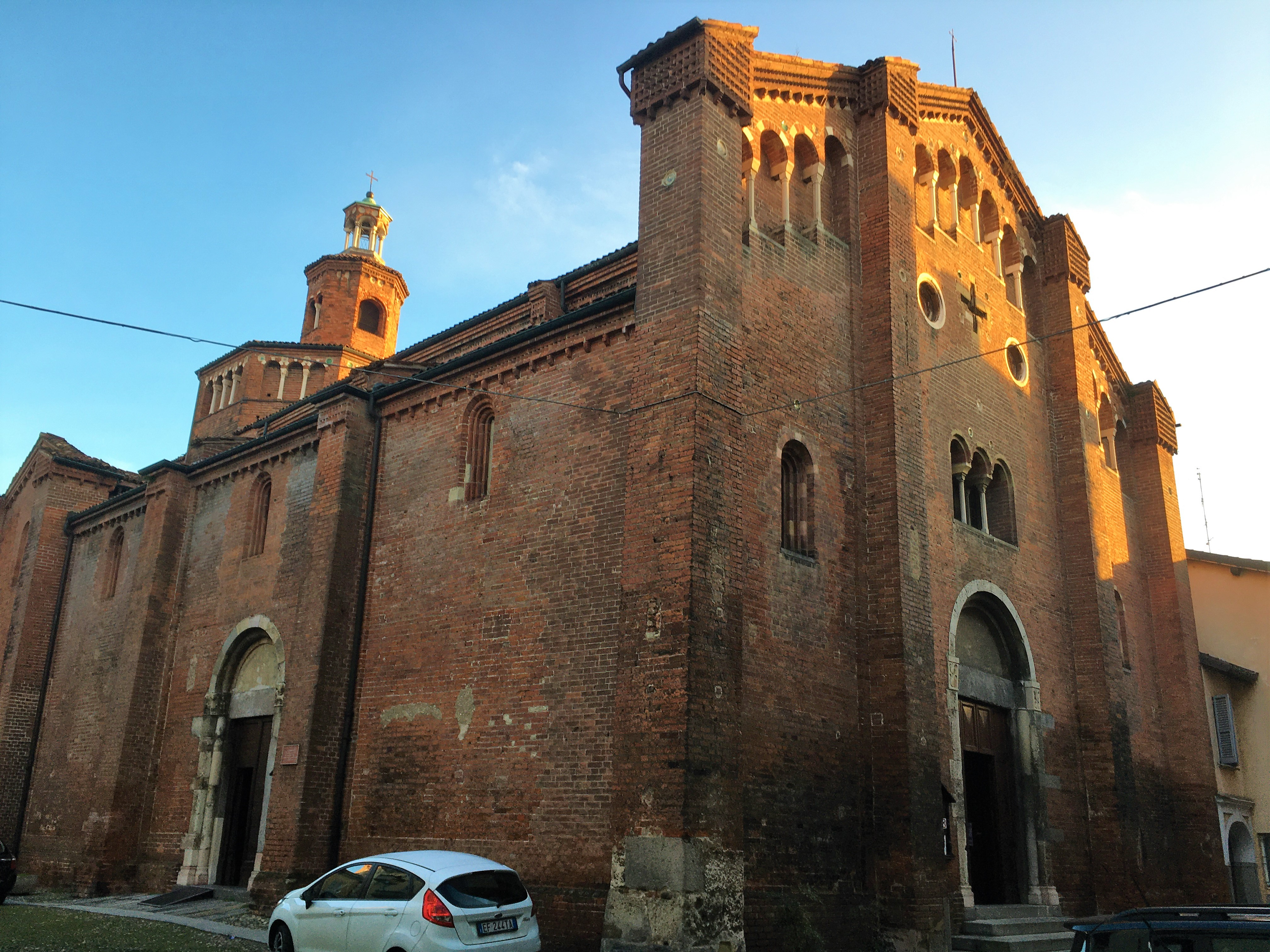
Church of San Teodoro

- San Teodoro: this church was built in the Lombard period in 752 and was rebuilt in 1117 and dedicated to Theodore of Pavia, a medieval bishop of the Diocese of Pavia, is the third. albeit smaller, Romanesque basilica in Pavia. Situated on the slopes leading down to the Ticino, it served the fishermen. The apses and the three-level tiburium exemplify effective simplicity of Romanesque decoration. Inside are two outstanding bird's-eye-view frescoes of the city (1525) attributed to Bernardino Lanzani. The latter, the definitive release, was stripped off disclosing the unfinished first one. Both are impressively detailed and reveal how Pavia's urban layout has changed little in 500 years.

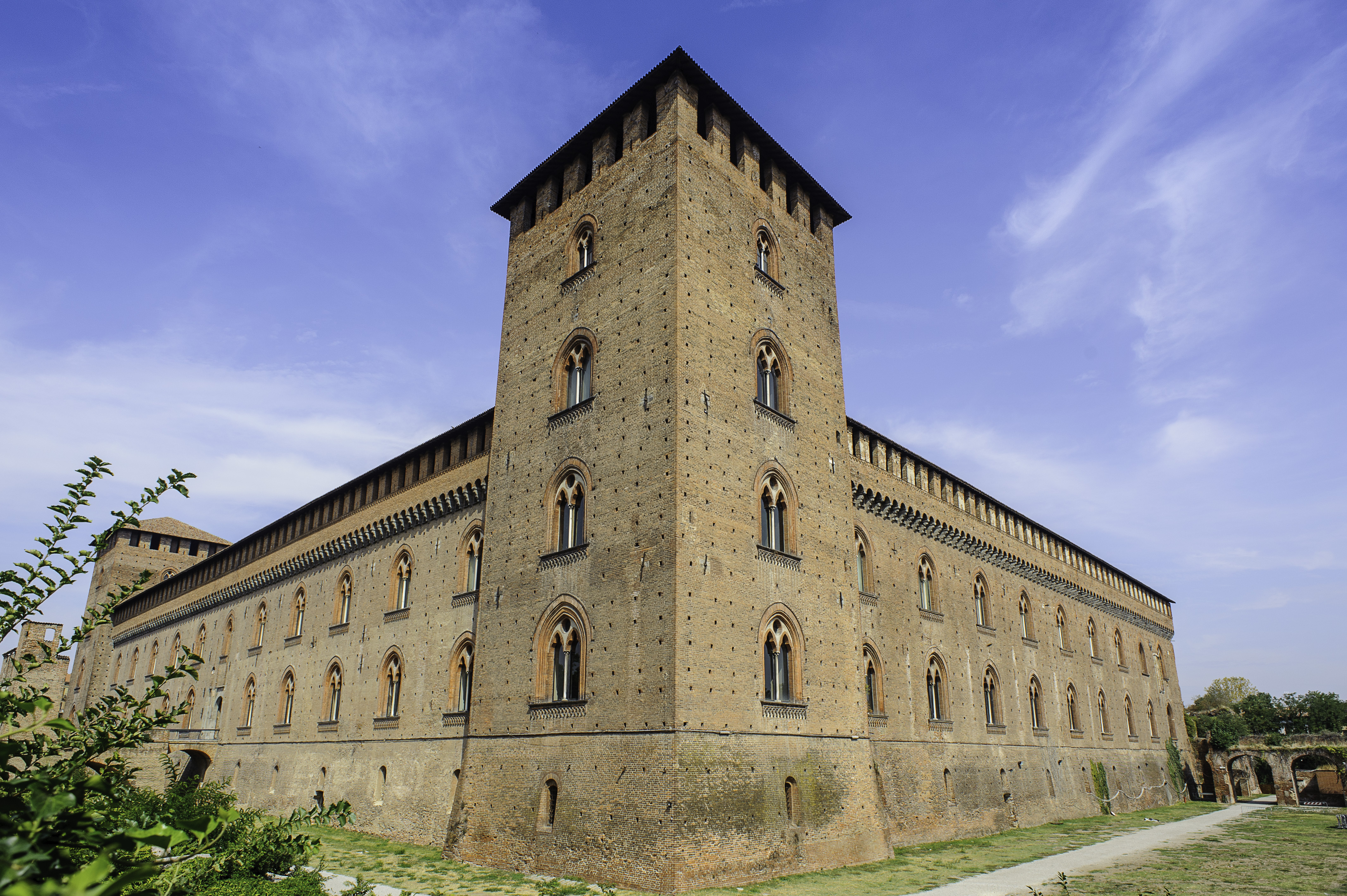
Visconti Castle

- Castello Visconteo: built in 1360–1365 by Galeazzo II Visconti, this large castle served as a private residence rather than a stronghold. The poet Francesco Petrarca spent some time there, when Gian Galeazzo Visconti called him to take charge of the magnificent library which owned about a thousand books and manuscripts, subsequently lost. The Castle is now home to the City Museums and the park is a popular attraction for children. An unconfirmed legend wants the Castle to be connected by a secret tunnel to the Certosa.

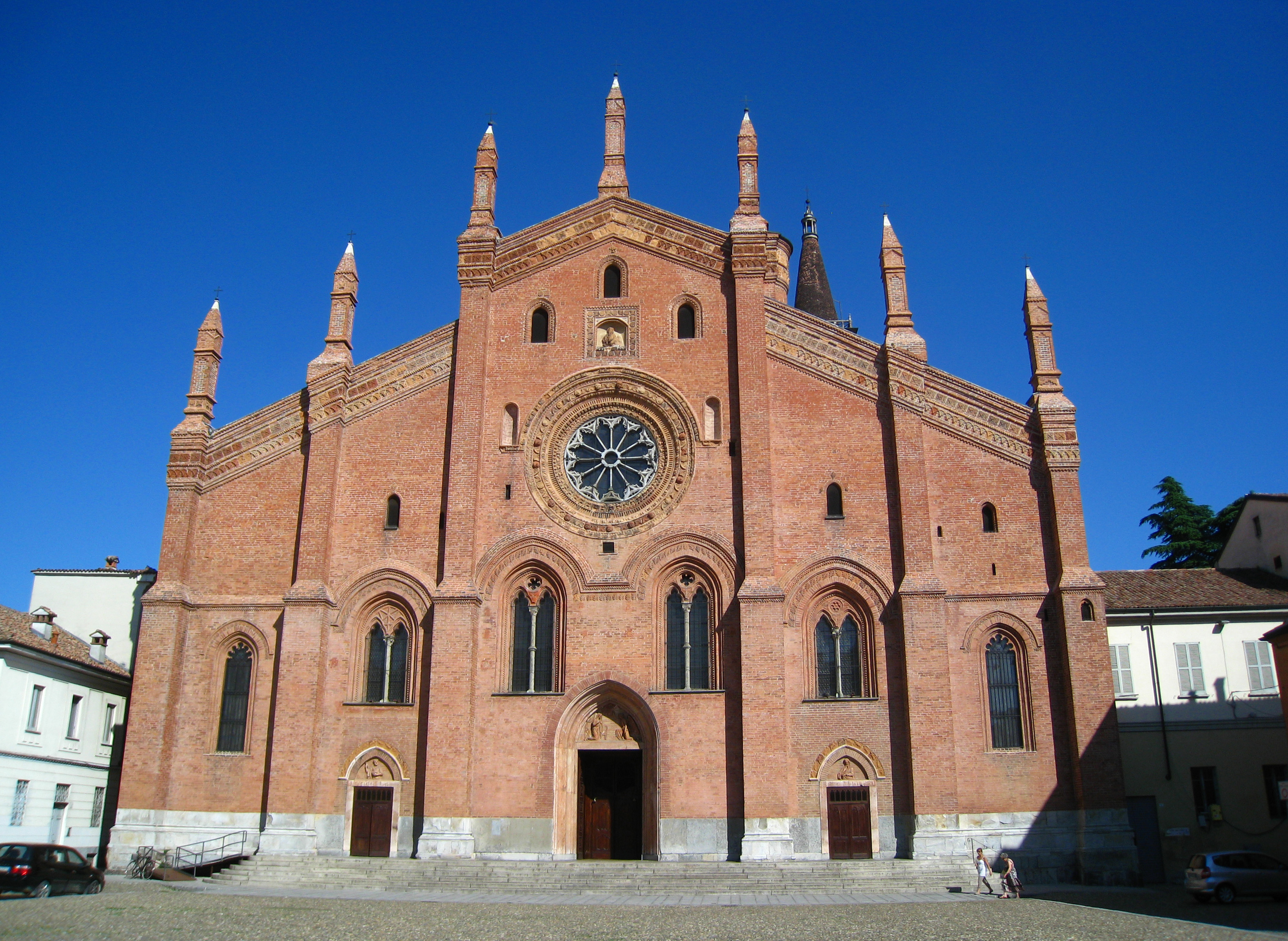
Church of Santa Maria del Carmine

- Santa Maria del Carmine: this church is a well-preserved example of Gothic brickwork architecture in northern Italy. Built, between 1374 and 1461, on the Latin cross plan, it is the second largest Pavian church after the Duomo, with a perimeter of 80 m × 40 m (260 ft × 130 ft) comprising a nave and two aisles. The characteristic façade has a large rose window and seven cusps.
- Basilica of Santissimo Salvatore: it was founded in 657 by the Lombard king Aripert I as a mausoleum of kings of the Bavarian dynasty, they were buried there Aripert I, Perctarit, Cunipert, Liutpert and Aripert II. by the will of Adelaide of Italy Majolus of Cluny created a monastery near the church in 971. It was rebuilt between 1453 and 1511.
- Crypt of Sant'Eusebio: the church was founded by King Rothari in the seventh century as the city's Arian cathedral. The church was demolished in 1923, but the crypt was preserved. The building, rebuilt in the 11th century, retains parts of the previous Lombard church, such as the capitals, very far from classical art.

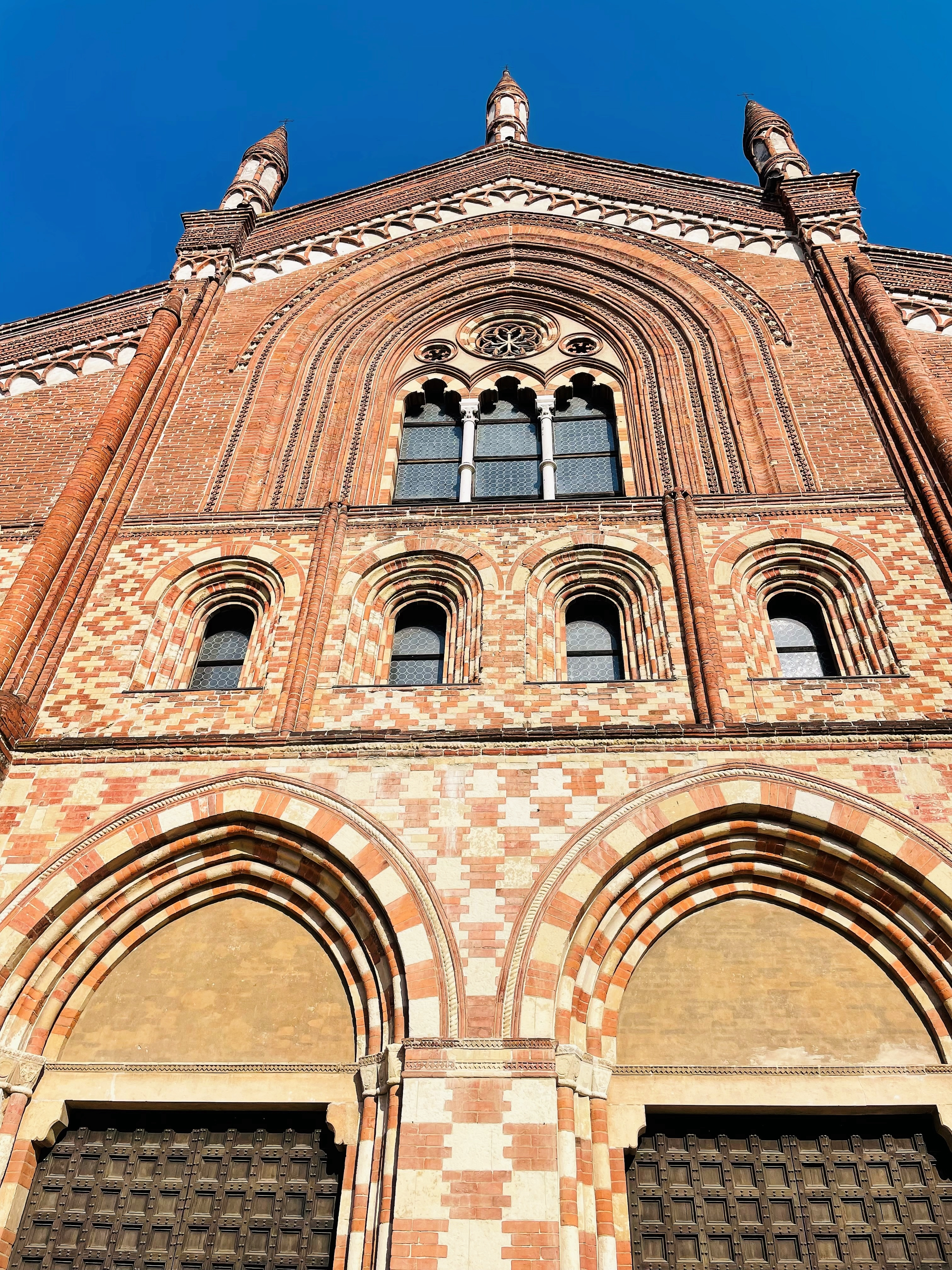
Church of San Francesco d'Assisi

- San Francesco d'Assisi: this is a late Romanesque church (1238–98) with a restored Gothic façade, located on Corso Cairoli.
- Santi Gervasio e Protasio: it is the oldest church in Pavia, founded by the bishop Juventius of Pavia in the 4th century. It was rebuilt in the 11th century and then in the 18th century. It keeps the 11th century bell tower. The Lombard kings Cleph and Authari were buried in the church and, in the 18th century, high Habsburg official Antoniotto Botta Adorno.
- San Giovanni Domnarum: the church was founded by Queen Gundeberga, wife of Rothari, who was possibly buried in the church. The building, built on Roman baths, was almost entirely rebuilt in the 17th century. The crypt (which incorporates Roman and Lombard remains) and the bell tower remain of the oldest church.
- Monastery of San Felice: the monastery was founded by the Lombard king Desiderius in 760. It was suppressed in 1785 and now houses some departments of the University of Pavia.
- Broletto: the palace was built between the 12th and 13th centuries, it was the seat of the city hall of Pavia until 1875 and now houses the IUSS School for Advanced Studies and is also used as the seat of temporary exhibitions of modern and contemporary art.
- Church Santa Maria Gualtieri: the church was founded in 989 by the judge and missus dominicus Walterius. It was rebuilt in the 11th century and reconsecrated by Pope Urban II in 1096. In 1788 it was deconsecrated and transformed into shops and homes. It was purchased by the municipality of Pavia and restored in 1991. It is now used for concerts, exhibitions and conferences.
- Old Campus of the University of Pavia: created by Ludovico il Moro between 1485 and 1490, it was rebuilt and enlarged at the behest of Maria Theresa and her son Joseph II from 1771 to 1787 on a project by Giuseppe Piermarini and Leopold Pollack. Other courtyards and classrooms were then added between 1819 and 1850. In 1932 the University incorporated the former San Matteo Hospital, built starting from 1451.

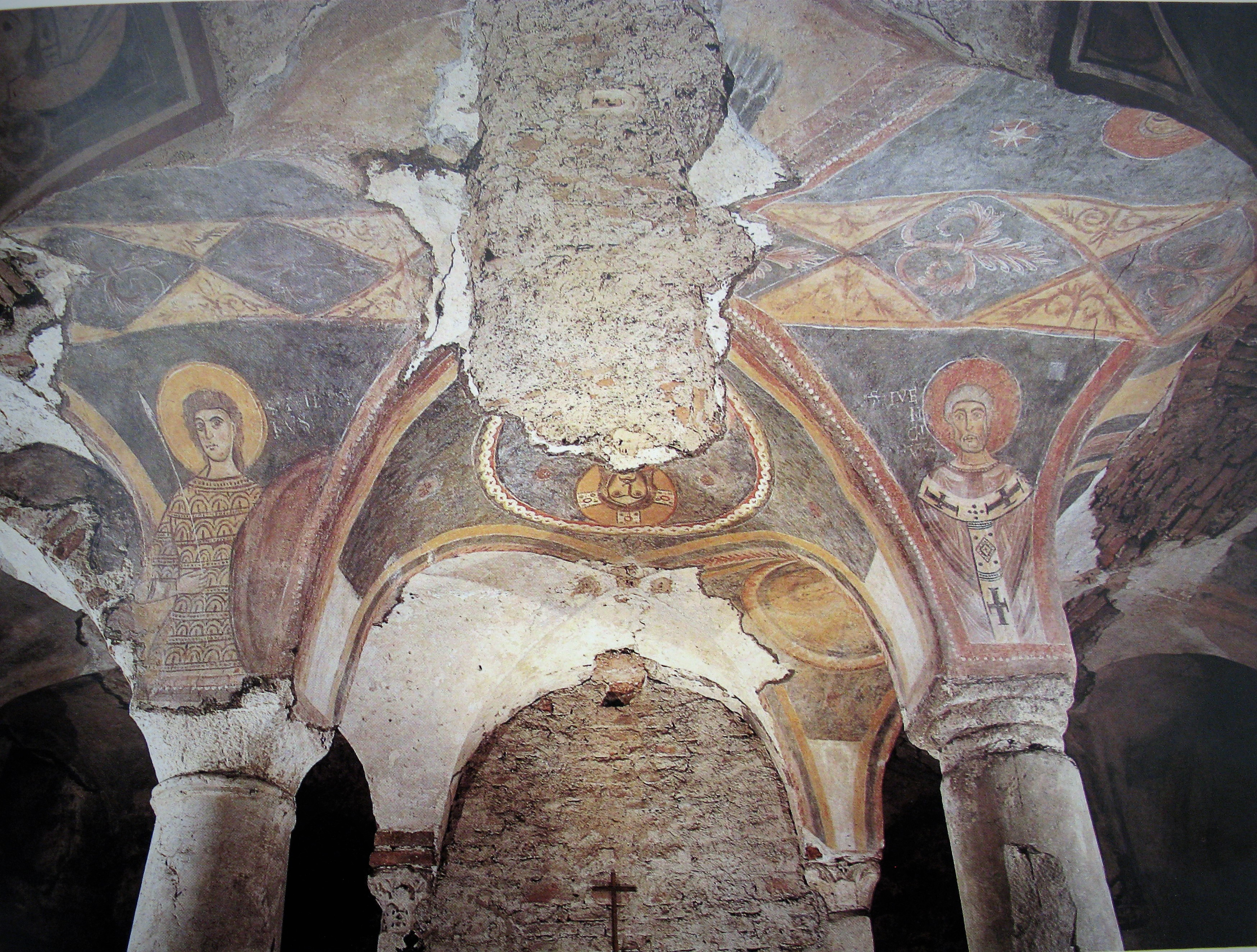
Crypt of the church of San Giovanni Domnarum with frescoes from the 12th century

- Mirabello Castle: the castle lies in what was once the Parco Visconteo, near Mirabello di Pavia. Between the 14th and 16th centuries, it was the seat of the Captain of the Park, the authority administering the Parco Visconteo on behalf of the Visconti and Sforza families. Only a wing of the original castle has survived.
- Santa Maria di Canepanova: this renaissance octagonal church is attributed to Bramante.
- Santa Maria in Betlem*: founded in the 9th century, it was rebuilt and enlarged in 1130. Near the church there was a hospital for pilgrims traveling to the Holy Land and for this reason the church depended on the bishop of Bethlehem. The church is in Romanesque style.
- San Lanfranco: founded in the 11th century, it was rebuilt in the first decades of the 13th century in Romanesque style, it preserves its interior the marble ark created by Giovanni Antonio Amadeo in 1489 to contain the relics of San Lanfranco Beccari.
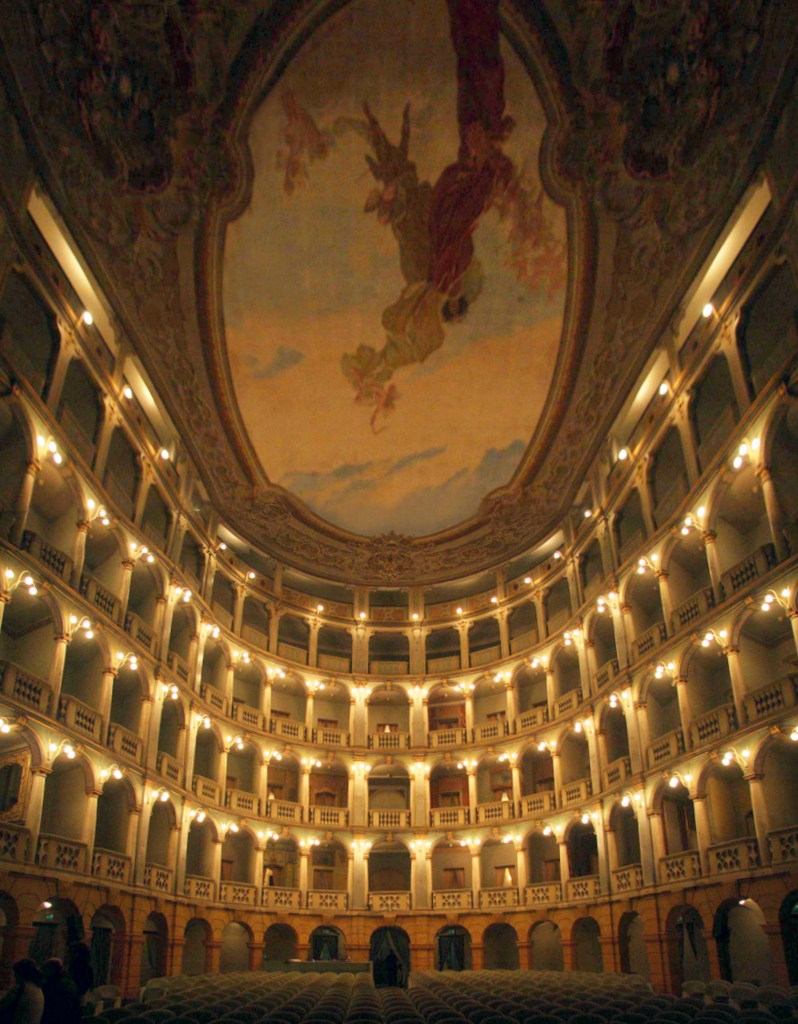
  Teatro Fraschini, Antonio Galli da Bibbiena, 1771–1773
- Church of San Tommaso: built on the remains of Roman baths, it is mentioned for the first time in an imperial diploma by Arnulf of Carinthia of 889. The church became the seat of the Dominican friars in 1302. Starting from 1320 work began for the construction of the new, and larger, church in the Gothic style, completed only in 1478. In 1786 the monastery was suppressed by Joseph II and transformed into the General Seminary for the Austrian Lombardy. Giuseppe Piermarini, charged with adapting the complex to the new destination, heavily modified the church. A few years later, in 1791, the seminary was closed and the complex became a barracks, and it remained so until the 1980s, when it was sold to the University of Pavia.
- Monastery of Santa Maria Teodote: the church was part of the monastery of Santa Maria Teodote, also known as Santa Maria della Pusterla, which was one of the oldest and most important female monasteries in Pavia. Founded between 679 and 700 by King Cunipert, it was suppressed in 1799 and has housed the diocesan seminary since 1868.
- Santi Primo e Feliciano: a 12th century Romanesque-style Catholic church.
- San Lazzaro: the church was founded by the noble Salimbene family in 1157 outside the city walls and along the Via Francigena. At the church there was also a hospital for the treatment of pilgrims and lepers. The church is in Romanesque style and preserves frescoes from the 13th century.
- San Marino: the church was founded by King Aistulf, who was buried in the church. It was modified several times over the centuries, but retains parts of the facade and apse of the original building.
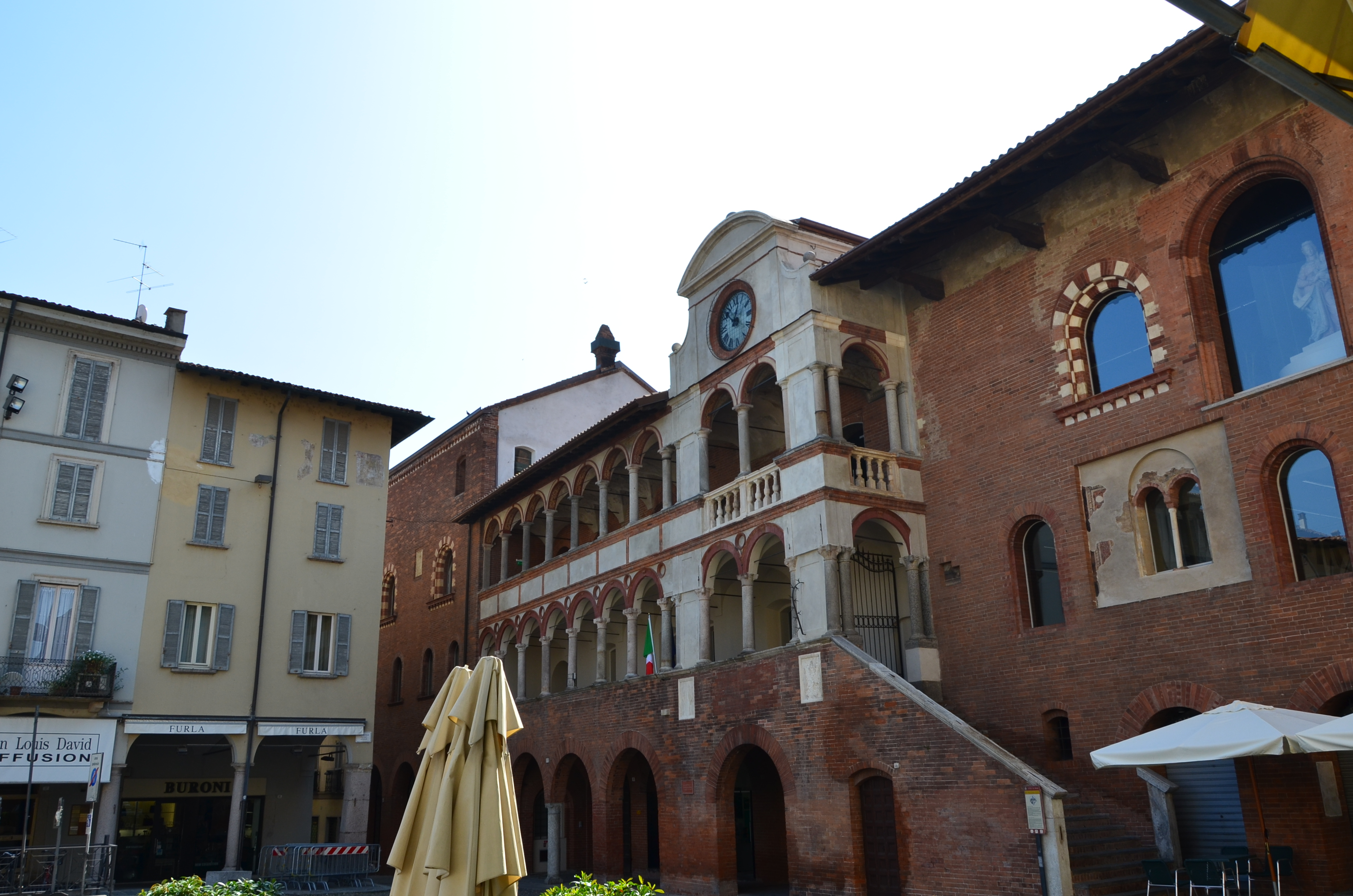
  Broletto
- San Pietro in Verzolo: the church was probably founded in the Lombard age and is documented since 737. In the 11th century it became the seat of a Benedictine monastery, then suppressed in 1798. The church still retains, despite the many changes, some sculptural and architectural elements of the 11th century.
- Towers of Pavia: characteristic of the historic center of Pavia is the presence of medieval noble towers that survive in its urban fabric, despite having once been more numerous, as evidenced by the sixteenth-century representation of the city frescoed in the church of San Teodoro. They were mostly built between the 11th and 13th centuries when the Ghibelline city was at the height of its Romanesque flowering. The towers present in Pavia, on the basis of historical and iconographic documentation, must have been about 65, of which about 25 survive.
- Teatro Fraschini: opera house commissioned by 4 aristocrats from Pavia to Antonio Galli da Bibbiena between 1771 and 1773. In 1869 it was acquired by the municipality of Pavia and was dedicated to the Pavese tenor Gaetano Fraschini.
- Ponte Coperto: it is a stone and brick arch bridge over the Ticino in Pavia, Italy. The previous bridge, dating from 1354 (itself a replacement for a Roman construction), was heavily damaged by Allied action in 1945. A debate on whether to fix or replace the bridge ended when the bridge partially collapsed in 1947, requiring new construction, which began in 1949.

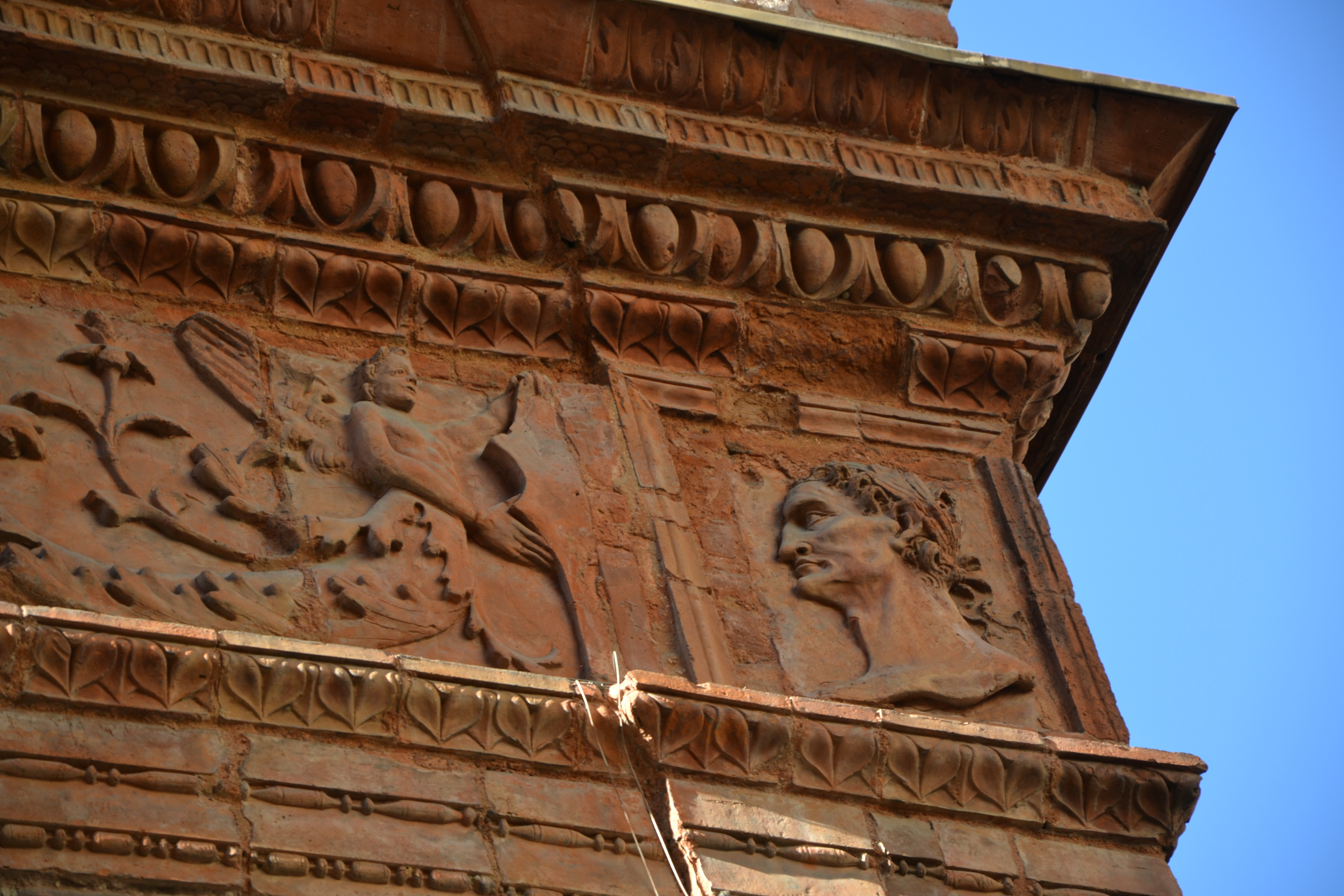
Palace Carminali Bottigella (1490–1499), detail of the decoration of the facade

- Collegio Castiglioni Brugnatelli: the college was founded by Cardinal Branda da Castiglione in 1429. The building, in Gothic style, preserves inside a chapel frescoed by Bonifacio Bembo in 1475.
- Casa degli Eustachi: it is a small brick Gothic-style building built in the first decades of the 15th century by Pasino Eustachi, captain of the fleet of Gian Galeazzo and Filippo Maria Visconti.
- Palazzo Cornazzani: it is a building dating back to the 15th century, which was inhabited, at different times, by Ugo Foscolo, Contardo Ferrini, Ada Negri and, between 1895 and 1896, Albert Einstein.
- Palace Carminali Bottigella: it is a noble palace built by the ancient Beccaria family from Pavia. The original structure from the Sforza era was built between 1490 and 1499. The façade, which retains the original terracotta decorations, is one of the major examples of Renaissance civil building in Pavia.
- Palazzo del Maino: the palace was built by the Bottigella aristocratic family from Pavia in the 15th century, in 1560 it was purchased by the Buscas and rebuilt in 1725 in the Baroque style, while maintaining some elements (such as the marble portal) of the Renaissance palace. It then passed to the Marquises of Maino and in 1932 it was acquired by the University of Pavia.
- Palazzo Mezzabarba: built in the Rococo style between 1726 and 1732, since 1875 is the city hall of Pavia.

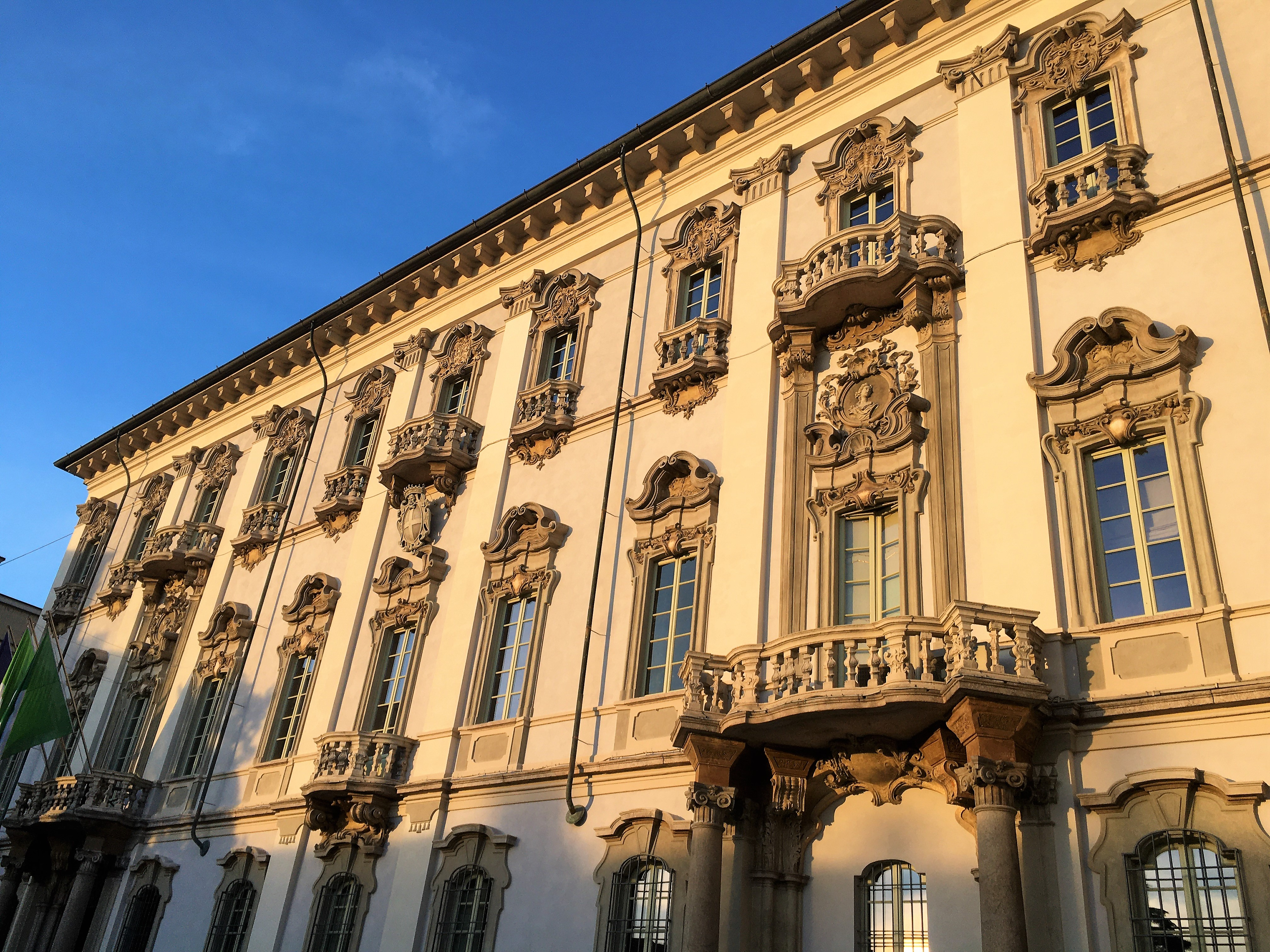
Palazzo Mezzabarba (1726–1732), city hall of Pavia

- Palazzo Bellisomi Vistarino: the palace designed by Francesco Croce, was rebuilt in rococo style between 1745 and 1753 by the Marquis Gaetano Annibale Bellisomi, demolishing the old family home. Since 2013 it has been the headquarters of the Alma Mater Ticinensis foundation of the University of Pavia.
- Palazzo Botta Adorno: built on a previous medieval building that belonged to the noble Beccaria family, it was rebuilt by the Botta Adornos between the 17th and 18th centuries. It was inhabited by Antoniotto Botta Adorno, high officer of the Habsburg monarchy and a plenipotentiary of the Austrian Netherlands. The building was purchased by the University of Pavia in 1887 and now houses Natural History Museum of Pavia.
- Palazzo Malaspina: the palace was rebuilt by the Marquis Luigi Malaspina di Sannazzaro in neoclassical style between 1794 and 1835. The palace now houses the Carlo Bonetta Library and Archivio Storico Civico of the City Council of Pavia.
- Galleria Arnaboldi: is a shopping arcade, which, in the form of a covered pedestrian street, connects Strada Nuova to Piazza del Lino, built between 1879 and 1882.

== Culture ==
=== Museums ===
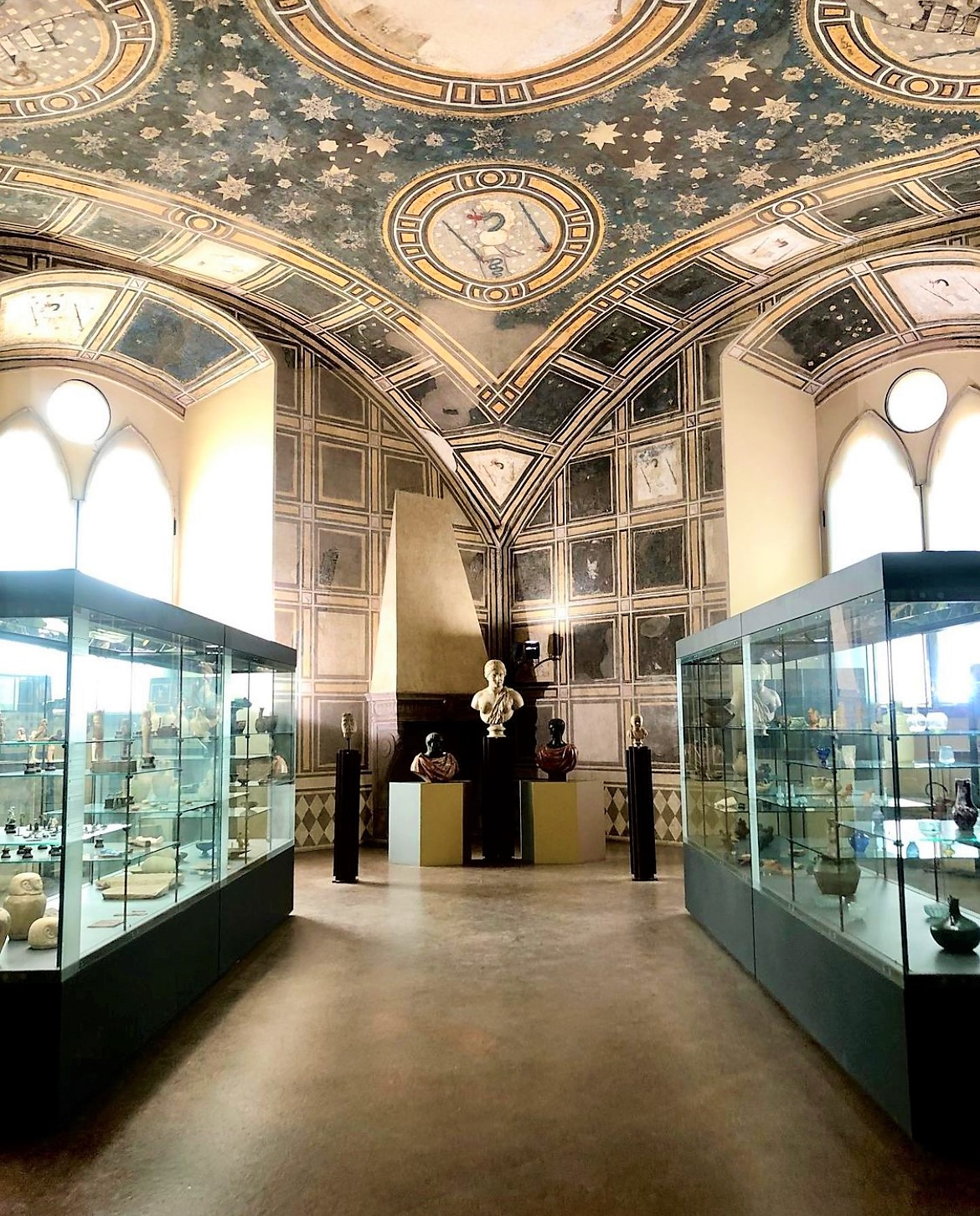
One of the rooms of the Civic Museums inside the Visconti Castle

The Pavia Civic Museums (located, in the Visconti Castle) are divided into various sections: Archaeological, which preserves one of the richest collections of Roman glass in northern Italy and important artifacts and archeological finds of Lombard period, such as the plutei of Teodota and the collection (the largest in Italy) of Lombard epigraphs, some of which belong to the tombs of kings or queens. Then there is the Romanesque and Renaissance section which exhibits sculptural, architectural and mosaic. The Romanesque collection is very rich, one of the largest in northern Italy, which also preserves important oriental architectural dishes from the Islamic and Byzantine East that adorned the facades of churches and buildings. Works by Jacopino da Tradate, Giovanni Antonio Amadeo, Cristoforo and Antonio Mantegazza and Annibale Fontana are also exhibited. The Civic Museums also house the Risorgimento museum, dedicating particular space to the social, economic and cultural life of Pavia between the 18th and 19th centuries, the collection of African objects collected by Luigi Robecchi Bricchetti during his explorations and the numismatic collection, which houses more than 50,000 coins, most of them belonging to Camillo Brambilla, which cover a chronological period between the classical Greek issues and the minting of the modern period.

The Pinacoteca Malaspina (which is part of the Pavia Civic Museums) established by the Marquis Luigi Malaspina di Sannazzaro (Pavia 1754– 1834), houses works by important artists of the Italian and international scene, from the 13th to the 20th century, such as Gentile da Fabriano, Vincenzo Foppa, Giovanni Bellini, Antonello da Messina, Bernardino Luini, Correggio, Paolo Veronese, Guido Reni, Francesco Hayez, Giovanni Segantini and Renato Gottuso. The monumental wooden model of the Pavia cathedral from 1497 is also exhibited inside the picture gallery.

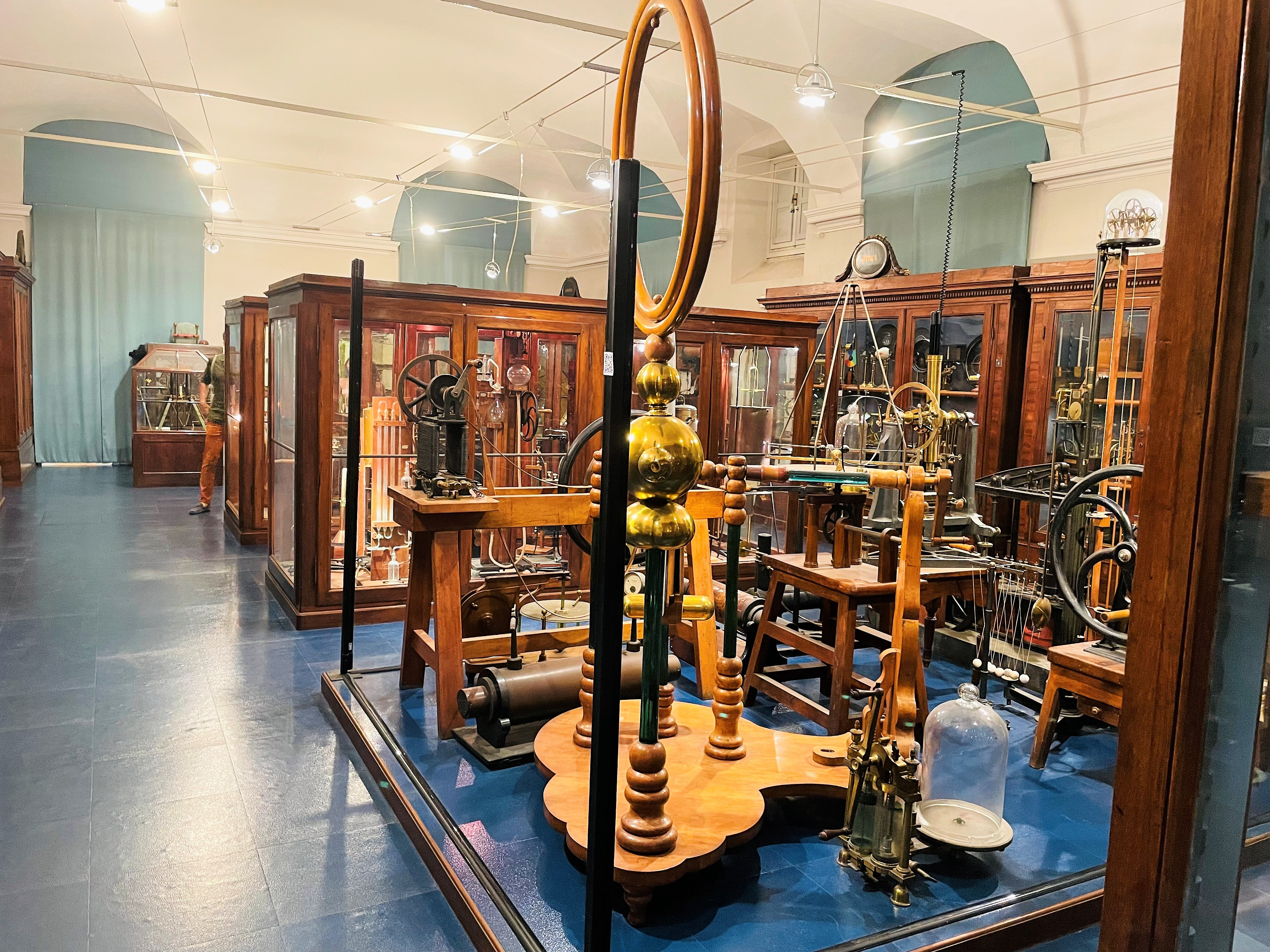
University History Museum, collection of instruments for the study of chemistry and physics, 18th and 19th century, some belonging to Alessandro Volta

The university's museum network is very vast, consisting of the University History Museum of the University of Pavia, divided between the Section of Medicine, where anatomical and pathological preparations, surgical instruments are also exhibited (the surgical paraphernalia of Giovanni Alessandro Brambilla) and life-size anatomical waxes, made by the Florentine ceroplast Clemente Susini and the Physics Section which houses the physics cabinet of Alessandro Volta (where hundreds of scientific instruments from the 18th and 19th centuries are exhibited, some belonging to Alessandro Volta).

The University's Museum of Archeology was established by Pier Vittorio Aldini in 1819 and houses prehistoric, Egyptian, Greek, Etruscan (including a collection of clay votive offerings donated by Pope Pius XI) and Roman (some from Pompeii).

The Natural History Museum of the University (Kosmos), housed inside Palazzo Botta Adorno, is one of the oldest in Italy, it was in fact founded by Lazzaro Spallanzani in 1771 and which preserves a naturalistic heritage of high scientific and historical value, including nearly 400,000 finds divided between the collections of zoology, comparative anatomy and paleontology. Then there is the Golgi Museum, located in the same environments in which both Camillo Golgi and his students worked, rooms and laboratories that preserve both the original furnishings and the scientific instruments of the time, in order to allow the visitor to enter inside a 19th-century research center; while the Museum of Electrical Technique, built in 2007, illustrates the history of electrical technology within five sections.

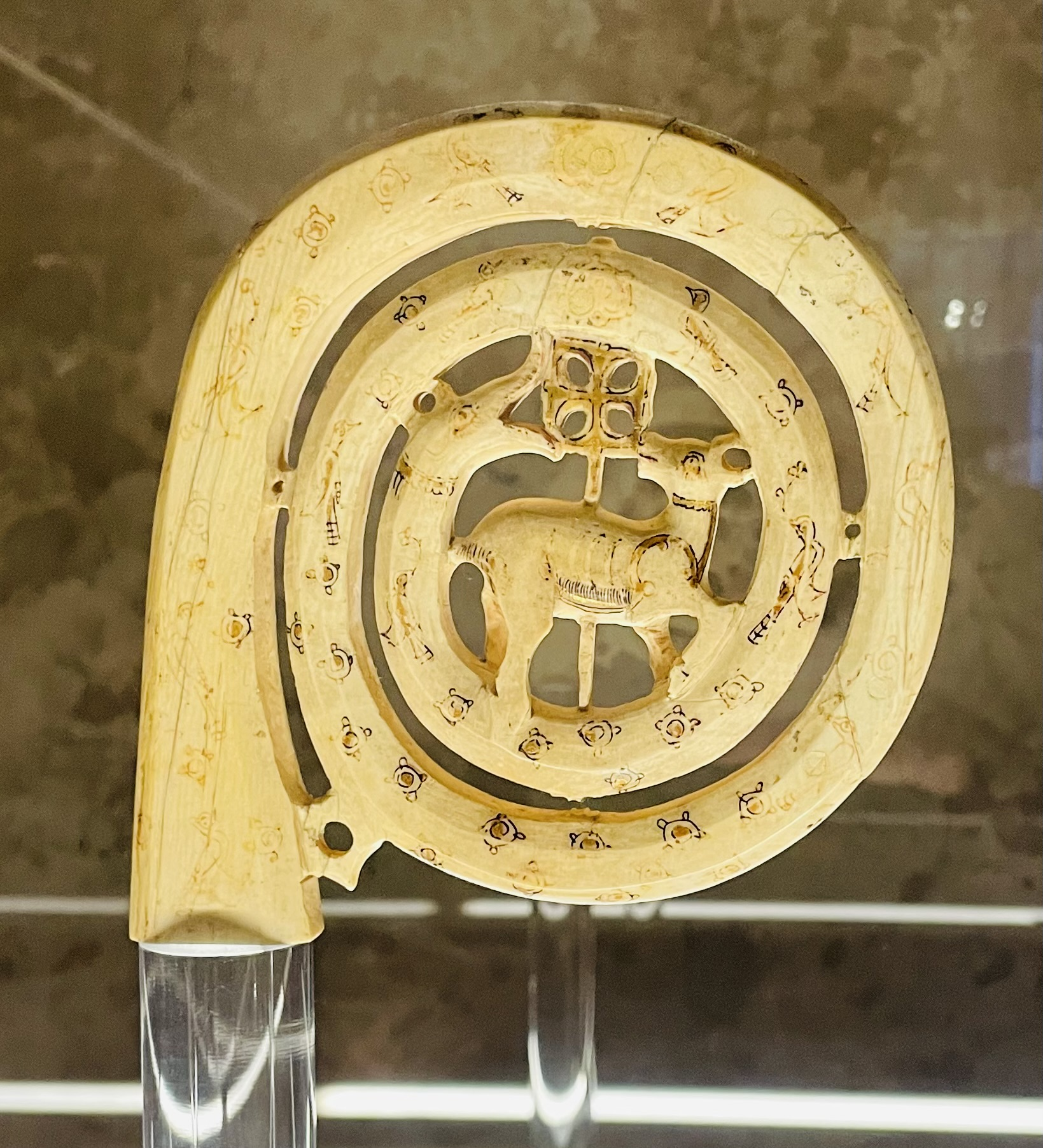
Diocesan Museum of Pavia, Sicilian-Arab master, crosier, ivory (12th century)

Then come the Museum of Chemistry, that of Physics and the Museum of Mineralogy, founded by Lazzaro Spallanzani.

Next to the Cathedral, inside the crypt of the ancient cathedral of Santa Maria del Popolo (11th century), is the Diocesan Museum of Pavia, inaugurated in 2023, which collects silverware and liturgical objects (among which a crosier in elephantine ivory carved, painted and gilded made by a Sicilian workshop by the hand of Arab craftsmen and dating back to the end of the 12th century), sculptures and paintings, such as the panel of the Madonna della Misericordia by Lorenzo Fasolo.

=== Libraries and archives ===
The history of the municipality of Pavia, from the tenth to the twentieth century, can be told through the amount of documentation collected within the Archivio Storico Civico (established in 1895), which also contains collections containing the archives of many aristocratic families from Pavia and of city personalities, such as Gaetano Sacchi, Benedetto Cairoli and Luigi Robecchi Bricchetti. The Archivio di Stato (founded in 1959) also collect funds from noble archives (Beccaria, Bottigella, Belcredi, Malaspina) and more, such as the Mori collection, which collects the papers of Cesare Mori. Also preserved in the archive are the acts of the notaries of Pavia (1256–1907), the maps of the Teresian Cadastre of the Pavia area (18th–19th centuries), and the archives of the university (1341–1897), of the San Matteo Hospital (1063–1900), the Prefecture, the Police Headquarters and the Court. Equally important is the Archivio Storico Diocesano, which houses the documentation of the diocese of Pavia since the tenth century.

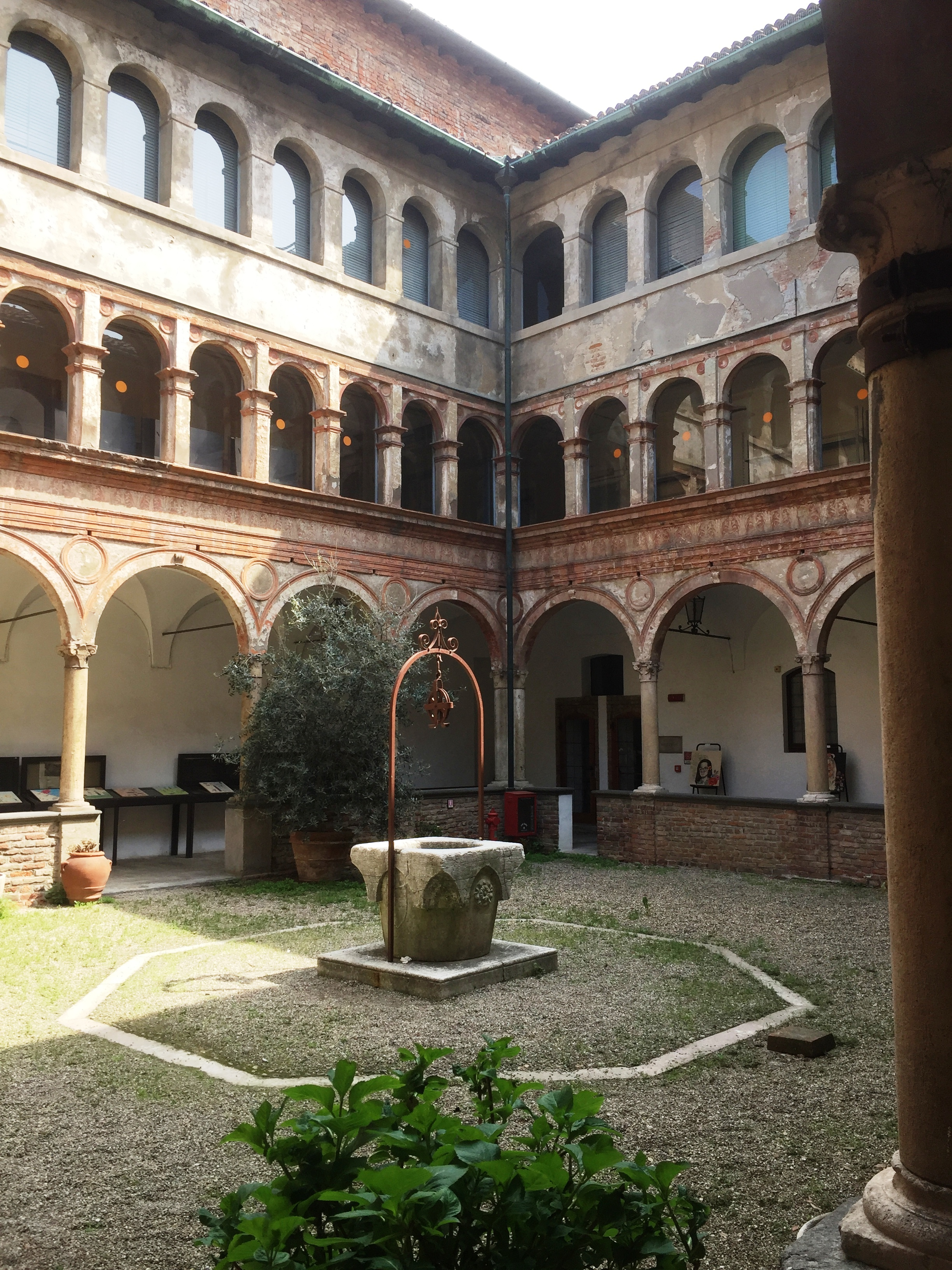
The Archivio di Stato is based in the former monastery of San Maiolo, founded in the 10th century and rebuilt at the end of the 15th century.

The Centro per gli studi sulla tradizione manoscritta di autori moderni e contemporanei (Formerly the "Research Center on the Manuscript Tradition of Modern and Contemporary Authors", also known as the "Manuscript Center"), founded by Maria Corti in 1980, is responsible for the conservation and to the study of modern and contemporary archival and bibliographic heritage. The center, among the most important of its kind in Italy, preserves collections of documentary material (manuscripts, typescripts, letters, first editions, libraries, photographs, drawings, furnishings, paintings and other objects) relating to writers, intellectuals, publishers, artists and scientists of the past two centuries. Among the archival collections preserved we remember those of Alberto Arbasino, Riccardo Bacchelli, Romano Bilenchi, Emilio De Marchi, Ennio Flaiano, Alfonso Gatto, Tonino Guerra, Claudio Magris, Luigi Meneghello, Eugenio Montale, Indro Montanelli, Salvatore Quasimodo, Mario Rigoni Stern, Amelia Rosselli, Umberto Saba and Roberto Sanesi.

The library tradition of Pavia among its origins from the Visconteo Sforzesca Library, established in the second half of the fourteenth century by Gian Galeazzo Visconti in the Visconti Castle, where the precious illuminated manuscripts of the dukes of Milan were kept. In 1499, with the fall of Ludovico il Moro, the king of France Louis XII took most of the manuscripts from the castle and they are now kept in the Bibliothéque Nationale de France in Paris. Of the nearly one thousand manuscripts that made up the library, only one codex remained in Pavia: I Trionfi di Francesco Petrarca kept in the Biblioteca Universitaria.

In the second half of the 16th century, three historic libraries arose in the city: that of the Episcopal Seminary and the libraries of the Borromeo and Ghislieri Colleges, founded respectively by Charles Borromeo and Pope Pius V to allow access to the university (then the only one of all the Duchy of Milan) to promising young people, but with scarce economic resources.

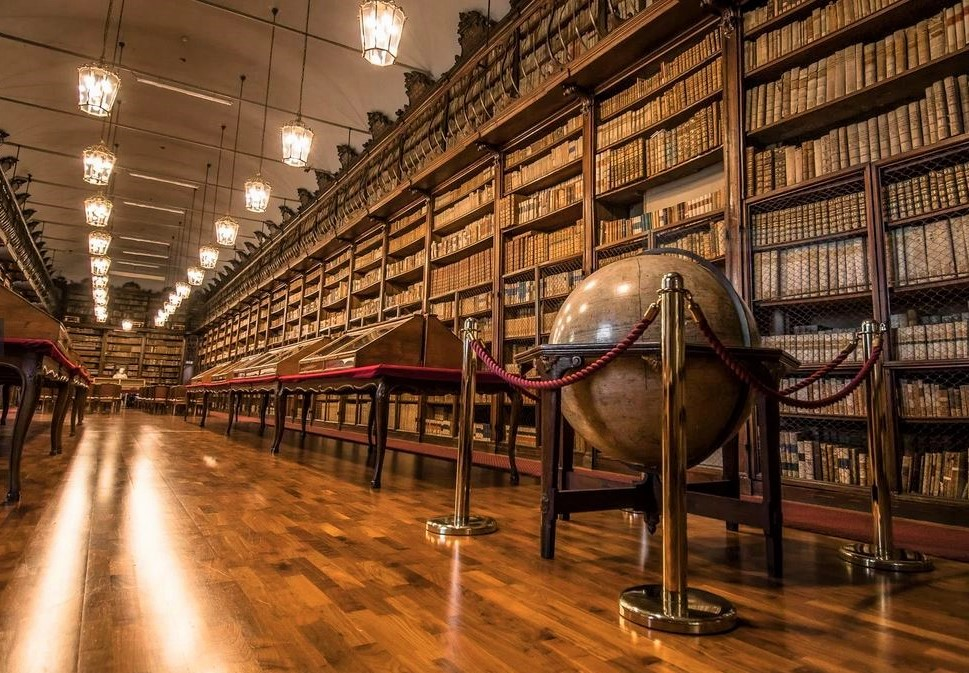
Biblioteca Universitaria, the salon designed by Giuseppe Piermarini, 1771

In 1754, by the will of Empress Maria Theresa, the Biblioteca Universitaria was created, the most important in terms of book heritage in the city, which also preserves 1,404 manuscripts, 702 incunabula, 1,153 parchments (from 1103 to 1787), the 3,592 old prints, and 1,287 old geographical maps.

In 1887 the Biblioteca Civica Carlo Bonetta was established, the main seat of the library system of the city which is divided into eight loan and reading points distributed evenly over the entire municipal area. Among the university libraries we should mention the Library of Humanistic Studies, born from the amalgamation of several libraries of the university's humanistic faculties, such as that of archeology (built in 1819), the Library of Science and Technology, where the library also merged of the Botanical Garden (established in 1773), the Law Library (1880), The Science Library, which also houses the volumes of the Medical and Surgical Society of Pavia (founded by Camillo Golgi in 1885), the Area Library Medica Adolfo Ferrata, the Political Science Library (built in 1925), the Economics Library and the Giasone del Maino College Library (born in 2000).

=== Cuisine ===
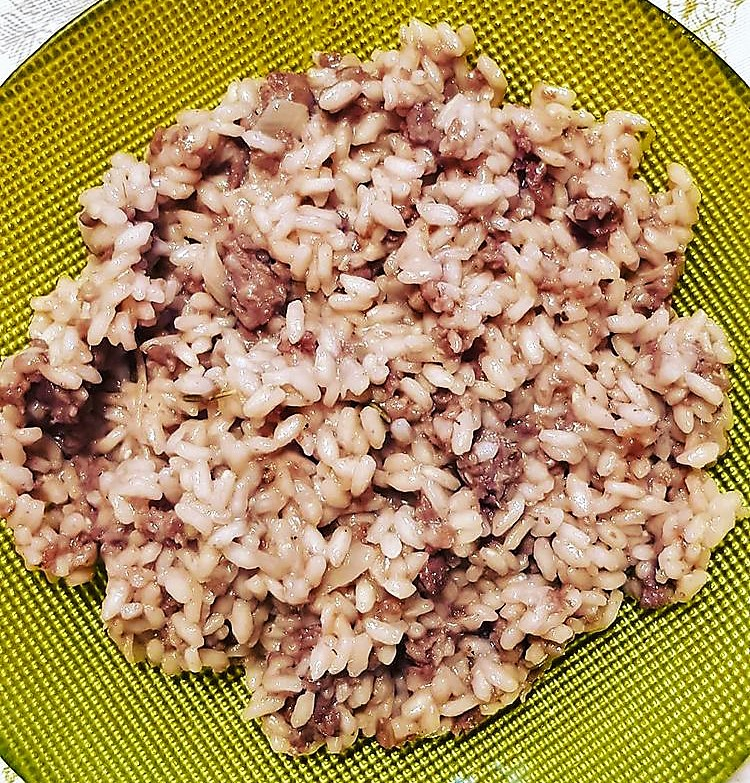
Risotto with sausage and Bonarda wine

Capital of a province shaped like a bunch of grapes—as described by Gianni Brera—Pavia is a land that yields many fruits, the origin of a variety of local dishes. Thanks to its wealth of spring waters and waterways, Pavia and its surrounding territory have become one of Italy’s main rice-producing areas. It is no coincidence, then, that numerous recipes showcase the many facets of this grain. Among them is risotto alla certosina, said to have been created by the monks of the Certosa monastery and made with river crayfish, carrots, and onions; risotto with black-eyed peas; risotto with sausage and Bonarda wine; and risotto with wild hops (known in dialect as ürtis).

Among the first courses, in addition to rice-based dishes, a notable mention goes to zuppa pavese, a rustic soup traditionally believed to have been invented by a peasant woman using the few ingredients she had on hand—broth, eggs, and cheese—to feed the King of France, Francis I, after his crushing defeat outside the city walls.

As for main courses, ragò alla pavese stands out—a local, lighter version of the better-known cassoeula, prepared solely with pork ribs. Other traditional dishes include munighili (Pavia’s version of mondeghili), stufato alla pavese (Pavia-style stew), büseca (veal tripe in the local style), ossobuco with peas (os büš cum i erbion), and "escaped birds" (üslin scapà)—thin veal slices stuffed with pancetta and sage. Meat, especially when boiled, is traditionally served with two types of sauces: peverada—already mentioned by Opicino de Canistris in the 14th century—made with bell peppers, celery, anchovies, and eggs; and bagnet verd, prepared with parsley, anchovies, garlic, and capers.

Alongside meat dishes, Pavia’s cuisine also includes many freshwater fish specialties, such as anguilla alla borghigiana (named after the ancient suburb of the city across the Ticino River beyond the Ponte Coperto), trout in white wine, and frittata with alborelle (a small freshwater fish). Not to be forgotten are frogs, served in risotto or stewed, and snails, often cooked with porcini mushrooms.

Among desserts, in addition to the well-known torta del paradiso, are pumpkin pie (turtâ d’sücâ), San Sirini—small, round sponge cakes soaked generously in rum and covered in dark chocolate, traditionally made in the weeks around 9 December, the feast day of Saint Siro—and sfâsö, typical carnival fritters. Panettone is found in a register of expenses of the Borromeo college of Pavia in 1599: on 23 December of that year in the list of courses provided for lunch Christmas costs also appear for 5 pounds of butter, 2 of raisins and 3 ounces of spices given to the baker to make 13 "loaves" to be given to college students on Christmas Day.

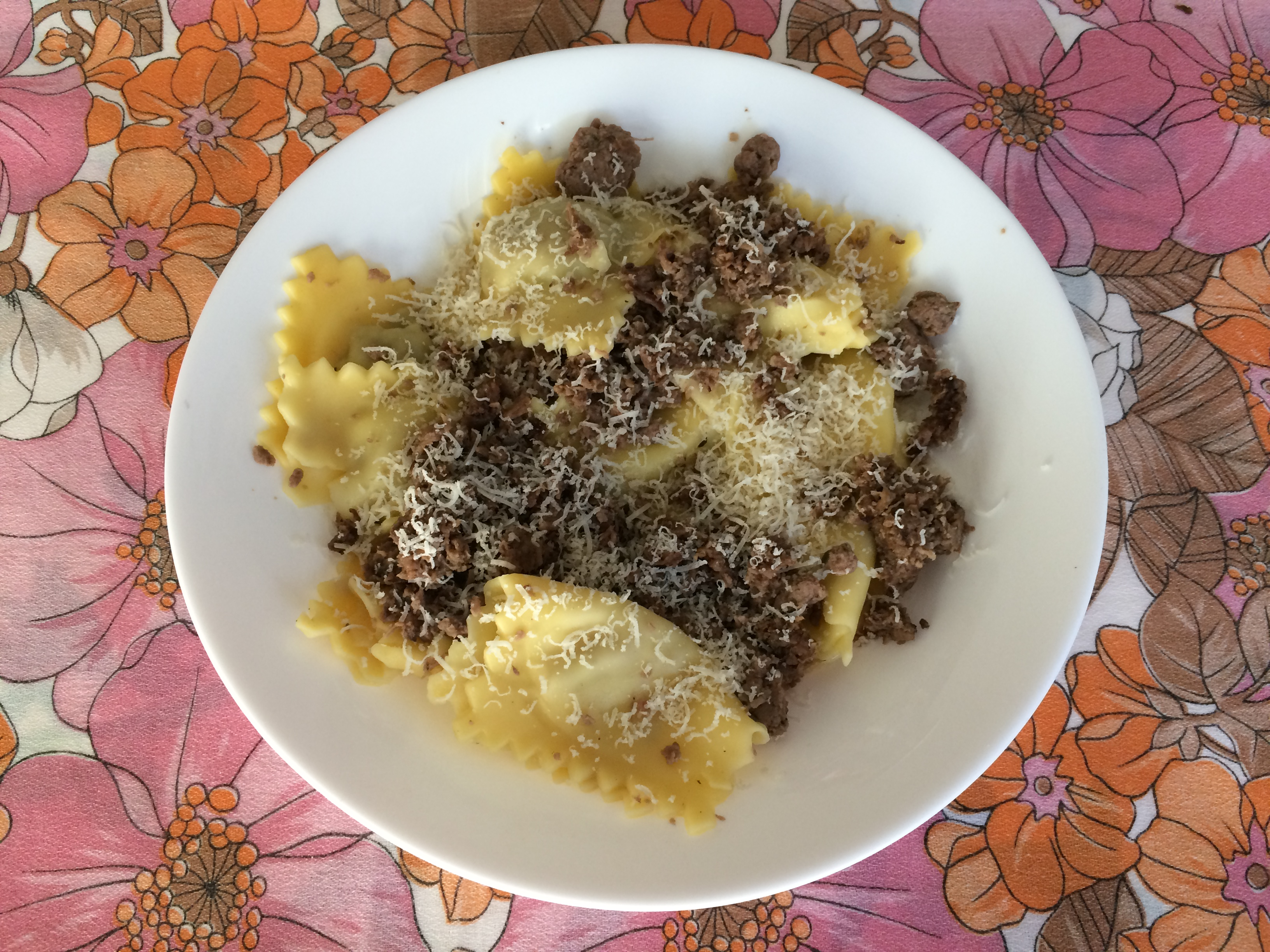
A plate of dry Pavese agnolotti, a type of stuffed pasta, with a Pavese stew-based sauce

Belonging to the province of Pavia, in particular to Oltrepò Pavese are Pavese agnolotti, a type of stuffed pasta. The filling of the Pavese agnolotti is based on Pavese stew. The recipe for this stuffed pasta is characterized by influences from Piedmontese and Piacentino cuisine, characteristics of areas that border the Oltrepò Pavese. The shape of the pasta was based on the Piedmontese agnolotti, and the filling of Pavese stew is based on stracotto alla piacentina, which is the filling for Piacentino anolini. The Piedmontese agnolotti, in particular, differ from the Pavese agnolotti due to the filling, which is instead based on roast meat. Pavese agnolotti is a typical dish of the Christmas tradition, and are consumed during celebrations and important occasions.

== Parks and gardens ==
The municipality of Pavia is part of the Parco naturale lombardo della Valle del Ticino and preserves two forests (Strict nature reserve Bosco Siro Negri and Bosco Grande nature reserve) that reflect the original state of the nature of the Po valley before the arrival of the Romans, before human settlement. To the north and east of the city, a small stream, originating from springs, the Vernavola, gives rise to a deep valley, escaped from urbanization, which is home to the Vernavola Park, while to the west, the green ring around Pavia is closed by the Sora Park. 9% of the surface of the municipality of Pavia is occupied by natural areas, parks or gardens (about 594 hectares, 1,470 acres, of which 312 hectares, 770 acres are covered with broad-leaved woods).

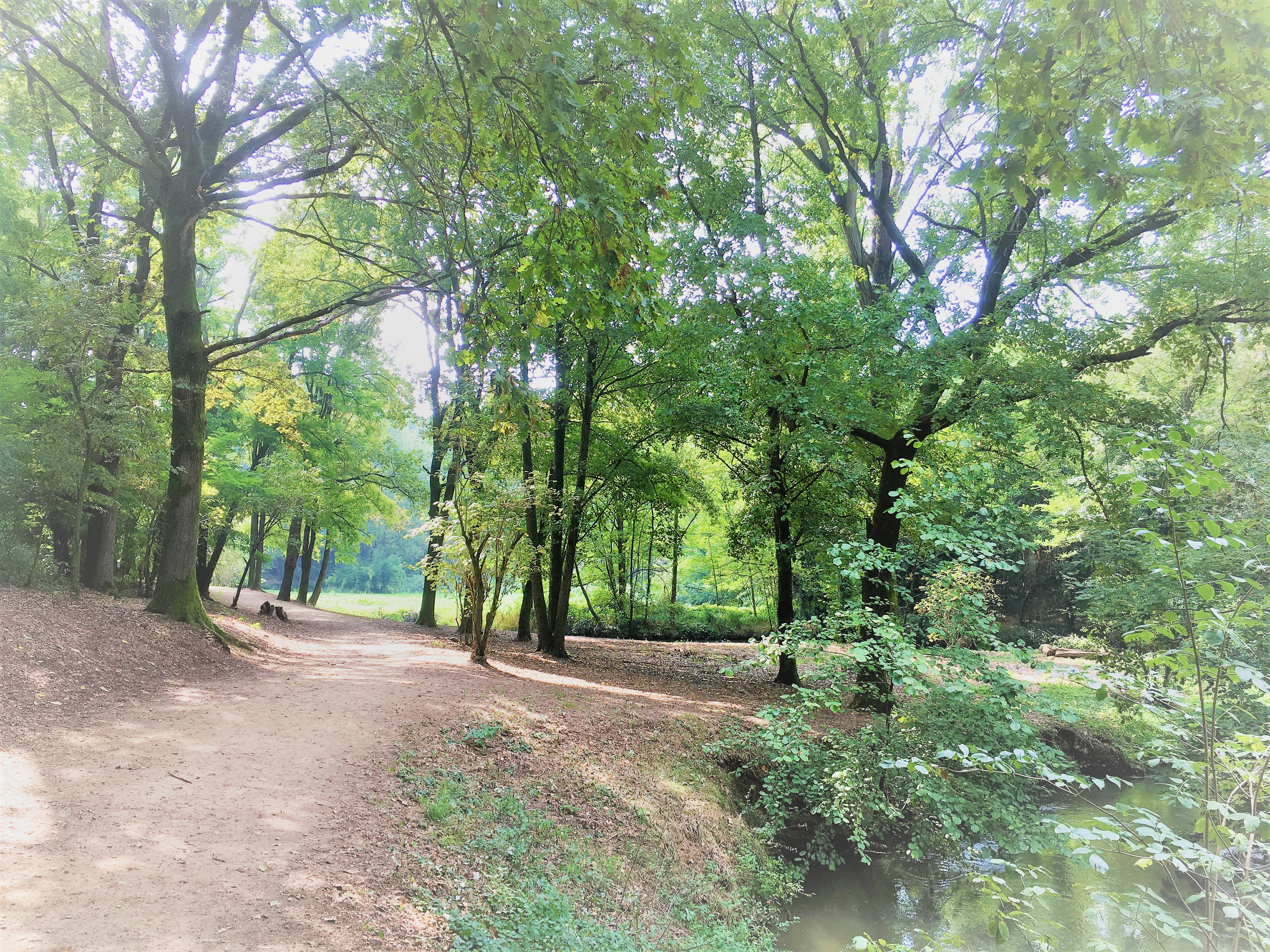
Vernavola Park

- Vernavola Park: large park, heir of the Visconti Park, with an extension of 35 hectares (86 acres) located north of the city. The battle of Pavia in 1525 is fought in the park.
- Ticino Valley Natural Park: regional park located along the banks of the Ticino from Lake Maggiore to the river Po. It forms a green belt around the city.
- Bosco Grande nature reserve: the Bosco Grande covers an area of about 22 hectares (54 acres) southwest of Pavia, it represents one of the last remnants of that lowland forest that in past times entirely covered the Po Valley and of which an important testimony remains in the Parco naturale lombardo della Valle del Ticino.
- Strict nature reserve Bosco Siro Negri: the reserve is a small strip of the Po Valley that was donated to the University of Pavia in 1967 by Giuseppe Negri, a lumber dealer and a great lover of nature. The reserve is located near the Ticino, a few kilometers from the center of Pavia. The forest show us the original state of the nature before the arrival of the Romans, before human settlement. The reserve covers an area of 34 hectares (84 acres).
- Sora Park: along the Ticino, to the North West, near the church of San Lanfranco is the Sora park, which extends for about 40 hectares (99 acres), inside which there are several micro-environments of high environmental value.
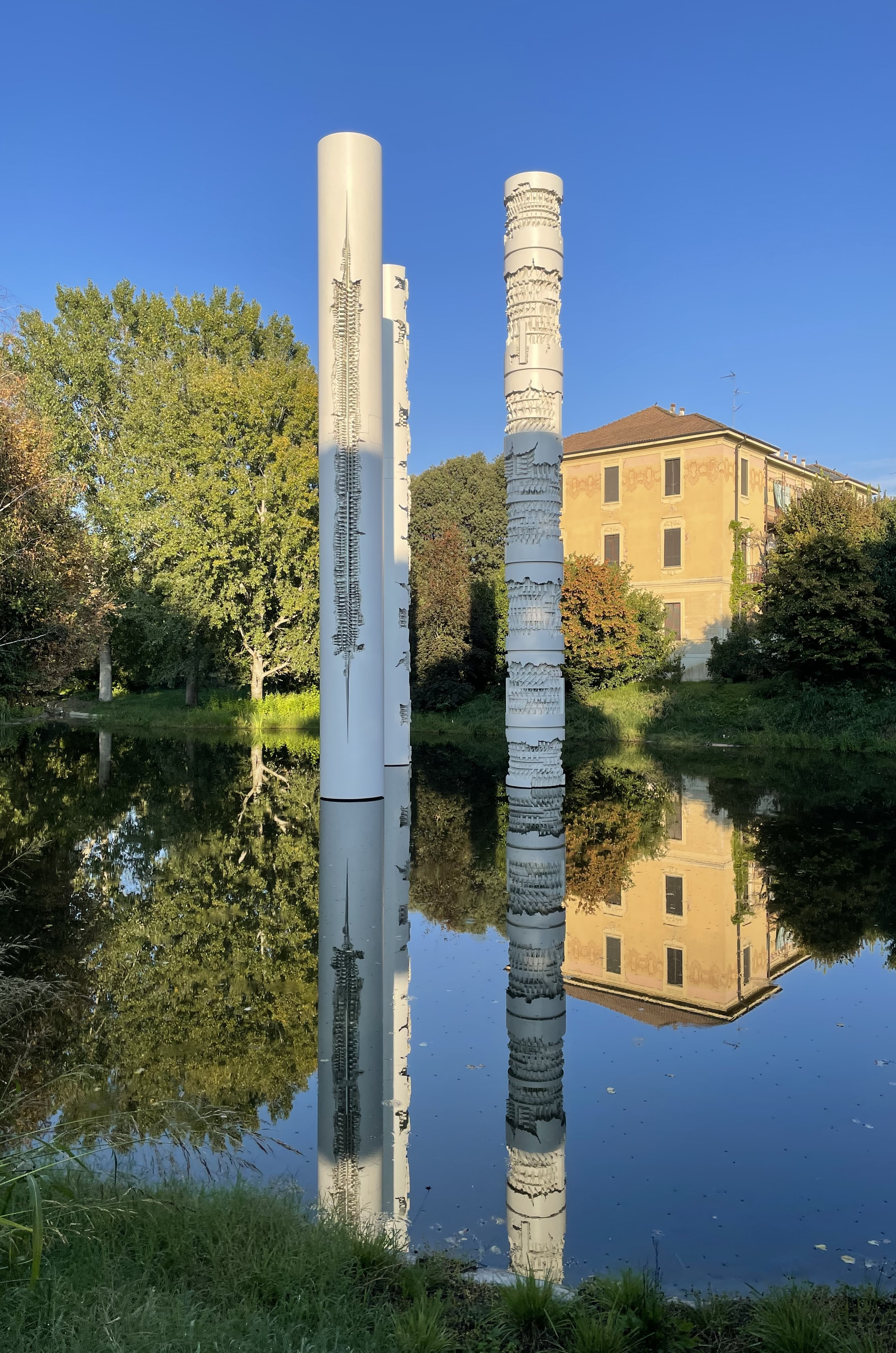
  Arnaldo Pomodoro, Triade, 1979, Horti Borromaici
- Horti Borromaici: the Horti are a vast urban park, covering an area of about 3.5 hectares (8.6 acres), located within the historic center of Pavia, between the Collegio Borromeo (which owns it) and Ticino, where the natural habitat is meets with contemporary art, knowledge and social inclusion. The park includes a vast naturalistic area, where over 3,000 native trees and shrubs have been planted, and an en plein air exhibition area of contemporary art, where works by: Arnaldo Pomodoro, Nicola Carrino, Gianfranco Pardi, Luigi Mainolfi, Mauro Staccioli, Salvatore Cuschera, Marco Lodola, Ivan Tresoldi and David Tremlett.
- Malaspina Gardens: public gardens in the historic center of the city (Piazza Petrarca), created, between 1838 and 1840, by the Marquis Luigi Malaspina as the English garden of his palace and a place for concerts and cultural events and retain a small temple and some neoclassical sculptures.
- Orto Botanico dell'Università di Pavia: established in 1773, it covers an area of 2 hectares (4.9 acres). It is mainly organized in living collections of plants such as rose garden, tea bed, orchid greenhouse, tropical greenhouse, utility plant greenhouse (designed in 1776 by Giuseppe Piermarini), arboretum, plane trees, flower beds of native plants of the Lombard Plain, living collections of seeds and collections of desiccat.

== Education ==
=== Schools ===
In 2021 there were over 45 schools of all types and levels, including: over 26 schools between Kindergarten and Primary schools (including one bilingual: Italian-English), 8 Lower secondary schools and 11 upper secondary schools. Some of these boast centuries of history, such as the Ugo Foscolo classical lyceum, originally started in 1557 near the convent of Santa Maria di Canepanova by the Barnabite Fathers or the Liceo Scientifico Torquato Taramelli (scientific lyceum), heir to the Normal Schools established in 1799.

=== Universities, colleges and other institutions ===
Pavia is a major Italian college town, with several institutes, universities and academies, including the ancient University of Pavia. Here is an incomplete list of the main institutions located in the city:

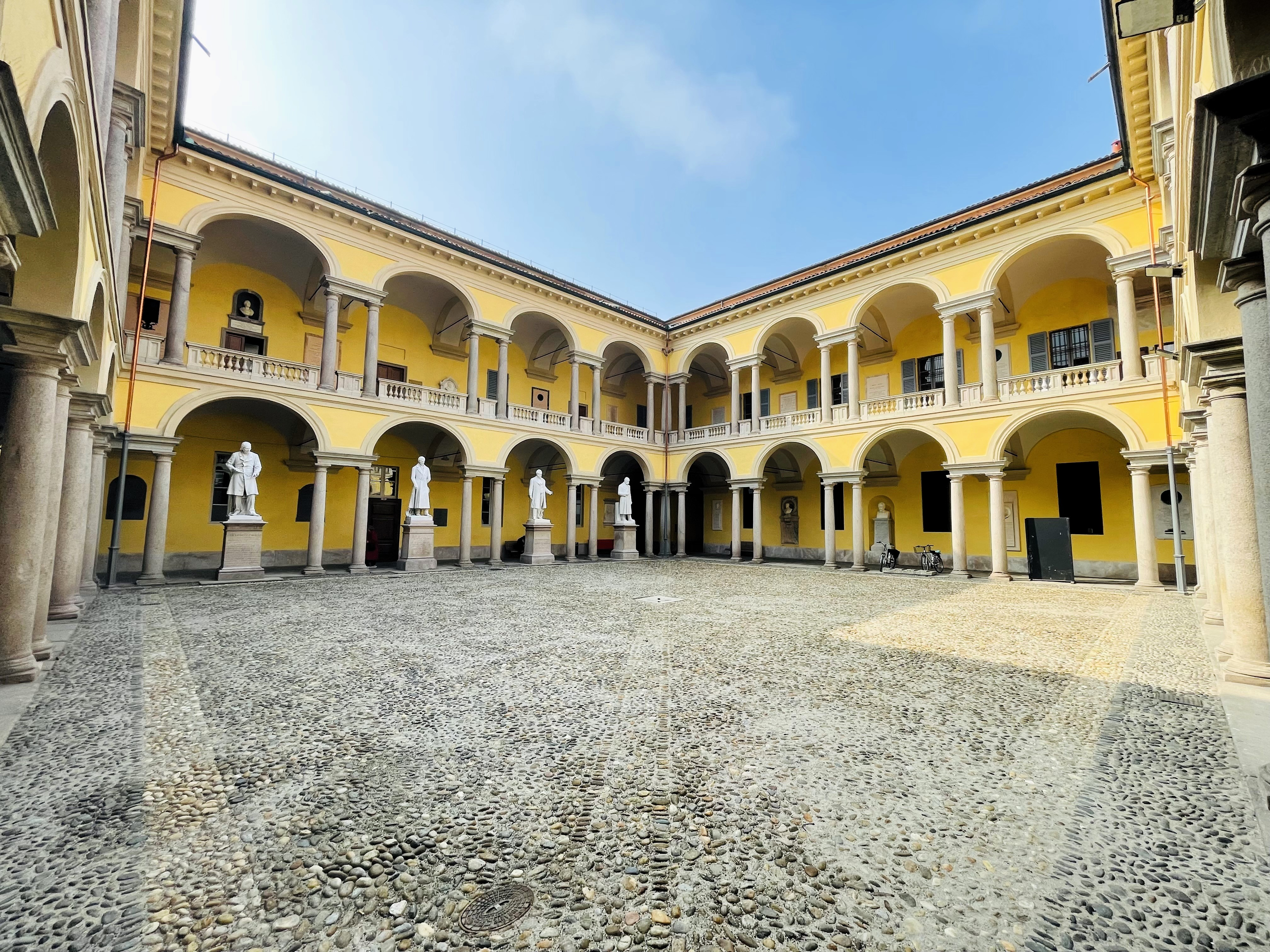
One of the courtyards of the Old Campus of the University of Pavia

- The University of Pavia, one of the most ancient universities in Europe, was founded in 1361, although a school of rhetoric is documented in 825 making this center perhaps the oldest proto-university of Europe. The Old Campus is a wide block made up of twelve courts of the 15th to 19th centuries. The sober façade shifts from baroque style to neoclassic. The Big Staircase, the Aula Foscolo, the Aula Volta, the Aula Scarpa and the Aula Magna are neoclassic too. The Cortile degli Spiriti Magni hosts the statues of some of the most important scholars and alumni. Ancient burial monuments and gravestones of scholars of the 14th to 16th centuries are walled up in the Cortile Voltiano (most come from demolished churches). The Cortile delle Magnolie holds an ancient pit. The Cortile di Ludovico il Moro has a renaissance loggia and terracotta decorations. Both courts, as well as two more, were the cloisters of the ancient Ospedale di San Matteo. The Orto Botanico dell'Università di Pavia is the university's botanical garden. There is also the University History Museum and the Natural History Museum of Pavia.
- Borromeo College (Ital. Almo Collegio Borromeo), founded in 1561 by Carlo Borromeo, is the oldest college at the University of Pavia in northern Italy.
- Ghislieri College (Ital. Collegio Ghislieri), founded in 1567 by Pope Pius V, is the second ancient college in Pavia, with the other first being Almo Collegio Borromeo, and one of the most ancient colleges in Italy and co-founder of the IUSS, located in Pavia as well. Collegio Ghislieri is a 450-year-old Italian institution committed to promote University studies on the basis of merit, hosting around 200 pupils (males and females) who attend all faculties in Pavia State University, offering them logistic and cultural opportunities such as scholarships, lectures, conferences, a 100,000-volume library (third among private libraries in Northern Italy), and foreign languages courses. Each year about 30 new students coming from all over the country are selected by a public contest. Founded by Pope Pius V (Antonio Ghislieri) in 1567, since 18th century laically managed, nowadays under the High Patronage of the Presidency of the Italian Republic, it is ranked among high qualifying institutions by the Italian Ministry for Education and University.
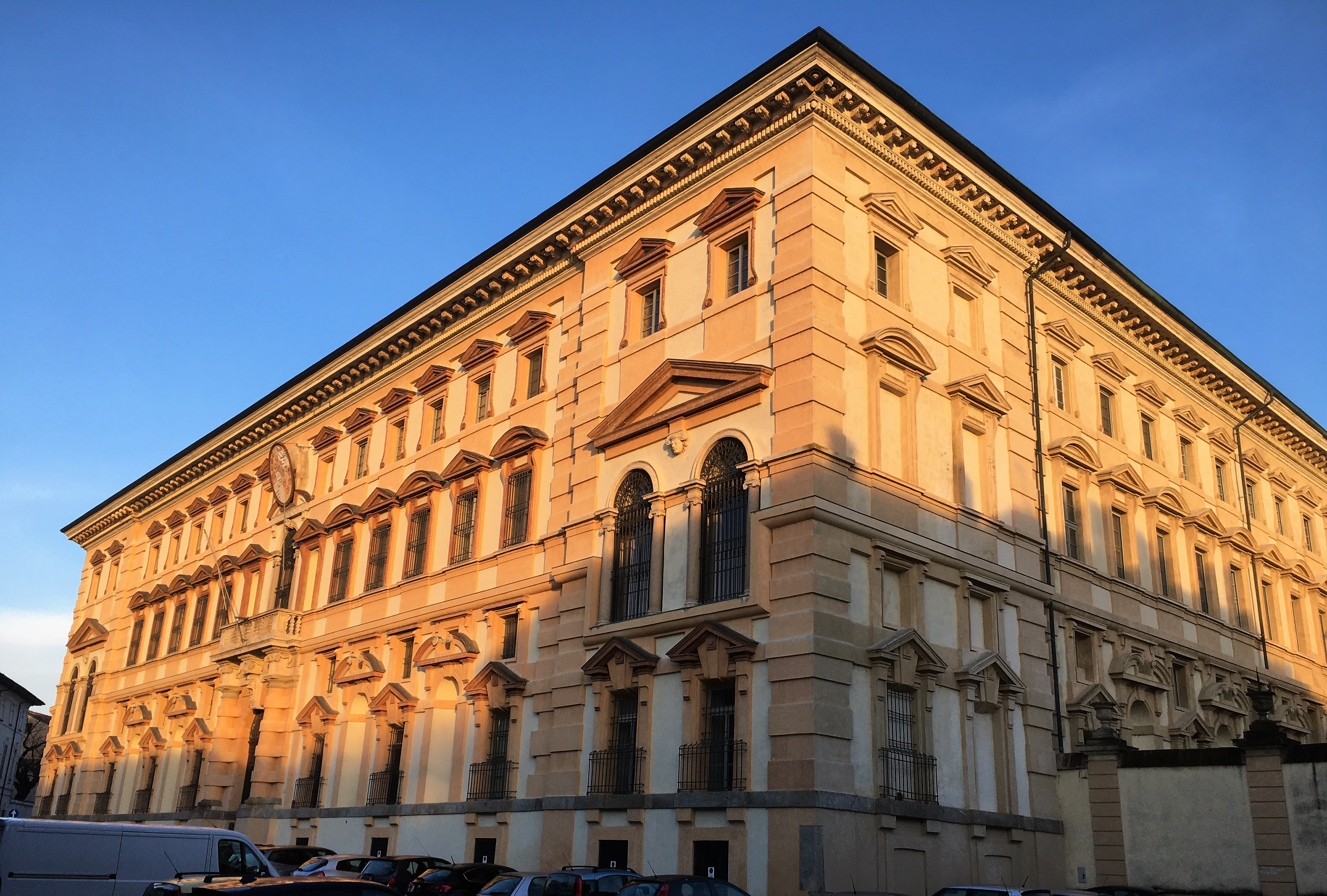
  Collegio Borromeo
- The IUSS Pavia or the "Istituto Universitario di Studi Superiori" of Pavia (Eng. IUSS School for Advanced Studies) is a higher learning institute located in Pavia, Italy. It was founded in 1997 by the University of Pavia, Borromeo College and Ghislieri College, supported by the Italian Minister of Education. It is shaped according to the Scuola Normale Superiore di Pisa model and reunites all the five colleges of Pavia, forming the Pavia Study System.

== Healthcare ==
Although the ancient hospitals intended for the reception and treatment of the sick and travelers arose in the city at least from the 8th century, the first Pavia hospitals serving the entire city of which documented traces remain are the hospital of Santa Maria in Betlem (attested from 1130) and that of San Lazzaro (1157), which were operational for centuries. After 1449, they ceded their primary role to the San Matteo Hospital which became one of the most important Pavia institutions. The ancient dedication to San Matteo is still carried by the San Matteo Polyclinic, whose full name is the Fondazione IRCCS Policlinico San Matteo Hospital.

In addition to Policlinico San Matteo Hospital, Pavia has five hospitals, including public and affiliated, specialist or general hospitals that cover the pathologies provided for by national protocols. Patients from other regions often resort to them. Among the hospitals, there are several that belong to the category of scientific hospitalization and treatment institutes, the so-called IRCCS. We recall, among the specialized ones, the Casimiro Mondino National Neurological Institute and the Maugeri Scientific Clinical Institute, while among the general hospitals the most important are the Institute of Care of the City of Pavia and the Santa Margherita Institute of Rehabilitation and Care.

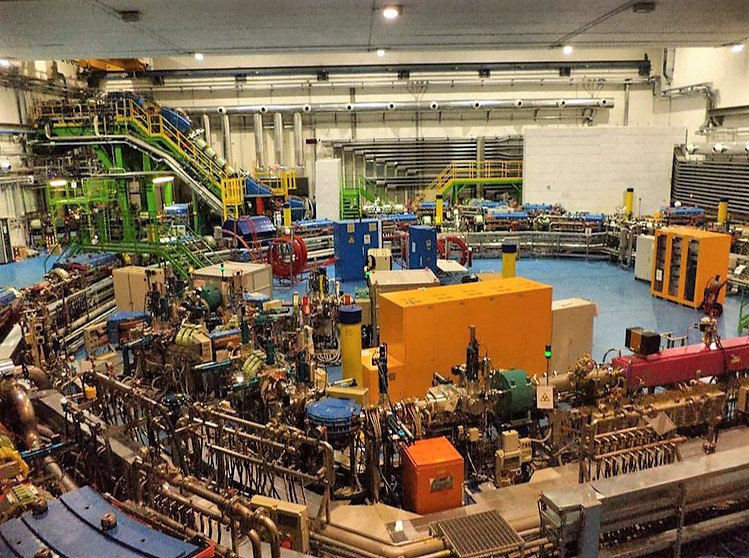
The synchrotron of the CNAO

In addition, Pavia hosts the National Center for Androtherapy Oncology (CNAO Foundation), the first hospital and clinical and radiobiological research in the center in Italy (the fourth country in the world to set up one). It was set up in 2010 by the Ministry of Health and specializes in the treatment of radioresistant tumors through the use of particle therapy. The Center also carries out scientific research to identify effective tools in the fight against cancer.

The CNAO uses a synchrotron where particles are produced in two sources, these are pre-accelerated by a linear accelerator and sent to an injection line for transfer into the synchrotron ring, where they are further accelerated and extracted.

== Demographics ==
Historical population
Year	Pop.	±%
1861	33,965	—
1871	38,079	+12.1%
1881	37,721	−0.9%
1901	37,611	−0.3%
1911	43,222	+14.9%
1921	44,861	+3.8%
1931	53,453	+19.2%
1936	56,122	+5.0%
1951	63,683	+13.5%
1961	74,962	+17.7%
1971	86,839	+15.8%
1981	85,029	−2.1%
1991	76,962	−9.5%
2001	71,214	−7.5%
2011	68,280	−4.1%
2021	70,380	+3.1%
Source: ISTAT

Starting from the 1980s Pavia has undergone a notable demographic involution due to the transfer of many families within the municipalities immediately bordering the capital. Within the urban agglomeration of the city of Pavia, according to calculations made by applying the international criterion of Functional Urban Areas, approximately 121,000 inhabitants would reside.

=== Ethnic groups ===
According to the latest statistics conducted by ISTAT, approximately 14.54% of the population consists of non-Italians. About the 33% of the immigrant population consists of those of various other European origins (chiefly Romanian, Ukrainian, and Albanian), the remaining are those with non-European origins, chiefly Dominicans (5,99%), Egyptians (5,84%), Chinese (4,81%) and Cameroonian (4,03%).

=== Religion ===
The first religious confession in Pavia is the Catholic one, which, unlike other areas of Lombardy, is of the Roman rite, with the exclusion, within the city, of the church of San Giorgio in Montefalcone, entrusted to the Ukrainian community of the Ukrainian Greek Catholic Church. The second religious community is the Eastern Orthodox Church one, like the Romanian one in via Repubblica and the Greek Orthodox church of Sant'Ambrogio, in via Olevano. Then there is the Muslim, who finds herself in two Islamic cultural centers (via San Giovannino and Via Pollack), while for some time there have been places of worship for Protestants in Pavia, such as the Waldensian Church in via Alessandro Rolla, the Evangelical Church of Assemblies of God in via Angelo Ferrari, the Evangelical Church of Reconciliation in viale Cremona, the Church of Jesus Christ of Latter-day Saints in via Grevellone and the Kingdom Hall of Jehovah's Witnesses in via Langosco.

== Economy ==
=== Agriculture ===
63.3% of the surface of the municipality of Pavia (about 4,000 hectares, 9,900 acres) is destined for agriculture and in particular for the cultivation of rice (about 2,400 hectares, 5,900 acres), which spread, starting from the 14th century, mainly in marshy land until it became, especially from the 18th century, the main cultivation. The large quantities of water required for the rice has meant that over the centuries a very dense irrigation network has been designed and built which still today characterizes the landscape of the Pavia countryside. It should also be noted that the city is the capital of the Italian province with the largest rice production in the country: over 84,000 hectares, 210,000 acres of the provincial land are used for paddy fields. The Province of Pavia alone produces as much rice as the entirety of Spain. The other crops present within the municipal area are that of corn and wheat (1,376 hectares, 3,400 acres), poplar groves (636 hectares, 1,570 acres), while very limited areas are used for meadows (158 hectares, 390 acres), orchards and vegetable gardens (29 and 30 hectares, 72 and 74 acres). Still within the territory of the municipality of Pavia, there are still around fifty farms destined for agricultural activity, 18 of which host cattle farms, where about 820 heads are raised.

=== Industry ===
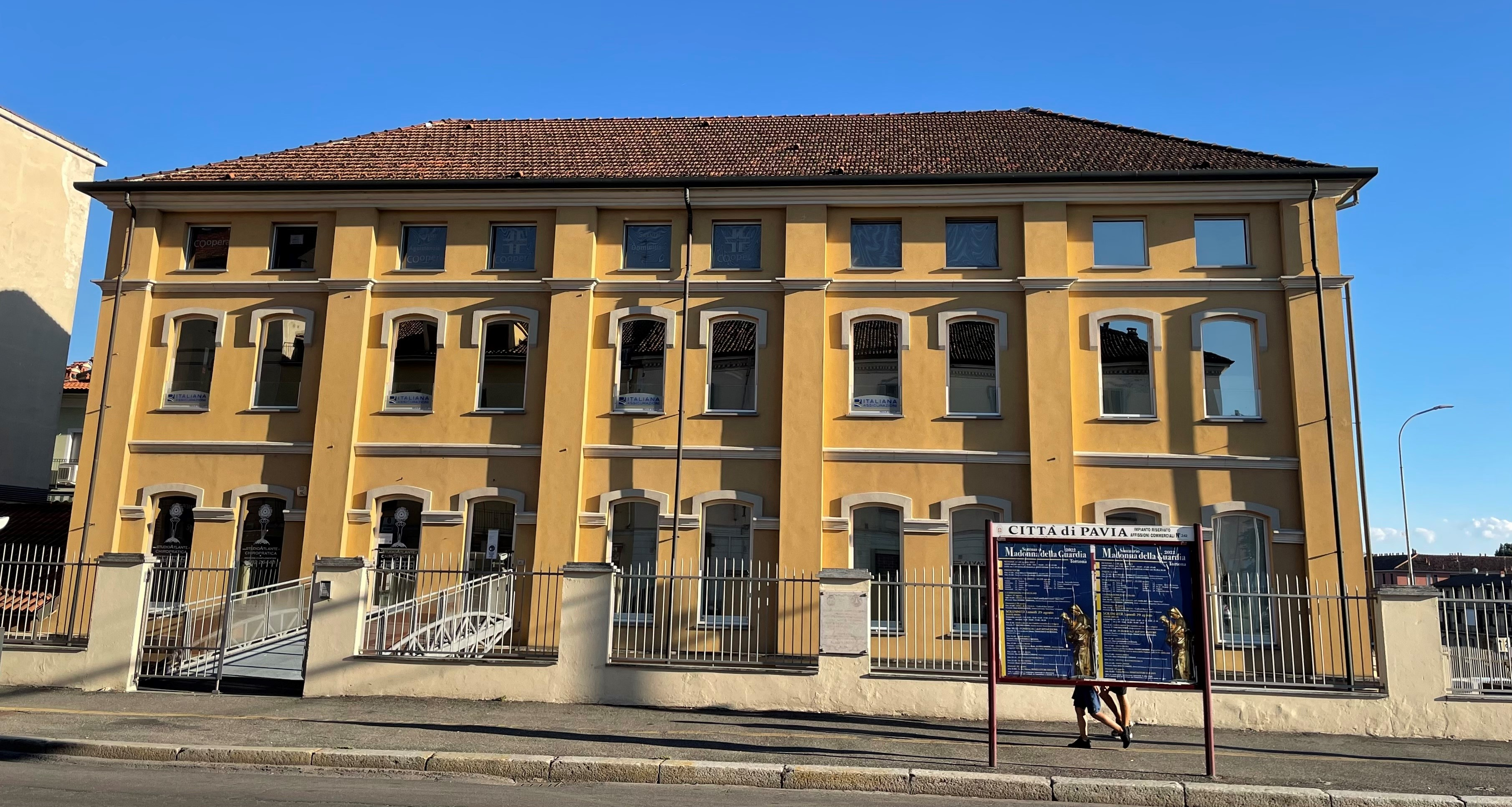
The former Einstein-Garrone Electrotechnical Workshops, founded in 1894 by Hermann Einstein, father of Albert Einstein

The city experienced a strong development of industry starting from the 1880s, so much so that it also hosted establishments of national importance, such as Necchi or the first large Italian factory of artificial silk and synthetic fabrics, the Snia Viscosa, built in 1905. In 1951 almost 27% of Pavia's workforce was employed in the industrial sector. Starting from the 1970s, the city underwent a sudden deindustrialization which led to the closure of many companies, especially those in the chemical and mechanical sectors, while those related to the food sector, such as Riso Scotti, pharmaceutical companies and related to packaging and labeling.

== Transport ==
Pavia railway station, opened in 1862, forms part of the Milan–Genoa railway, and is also a terminus of four secondary railways, linking Pavia with Alessandria, Mantua, Vercelli and Stradella.

Pavia is also connected to Milan through the S13 line of the Milan suburban railway service with trains every 30 minutes. Pavia P. Garibaldi is a small railway station on the Pavia–Mantua railway.

The nearest airports are Milan's Malpensa Airport, Linate Airport and Bergamo Airport which can easily be reached by car, train and bus.

== Twin towns – sister cities ==
Pavia is twinned with:

- Ayamé, Ivory Coast
- Besançon, France
- Bethlehem, Palestine
- Gyumri, Armenia
- Hildesheim, Germany
- Vilnius, Lithuania
- Zakynthos, Greece

== People ==
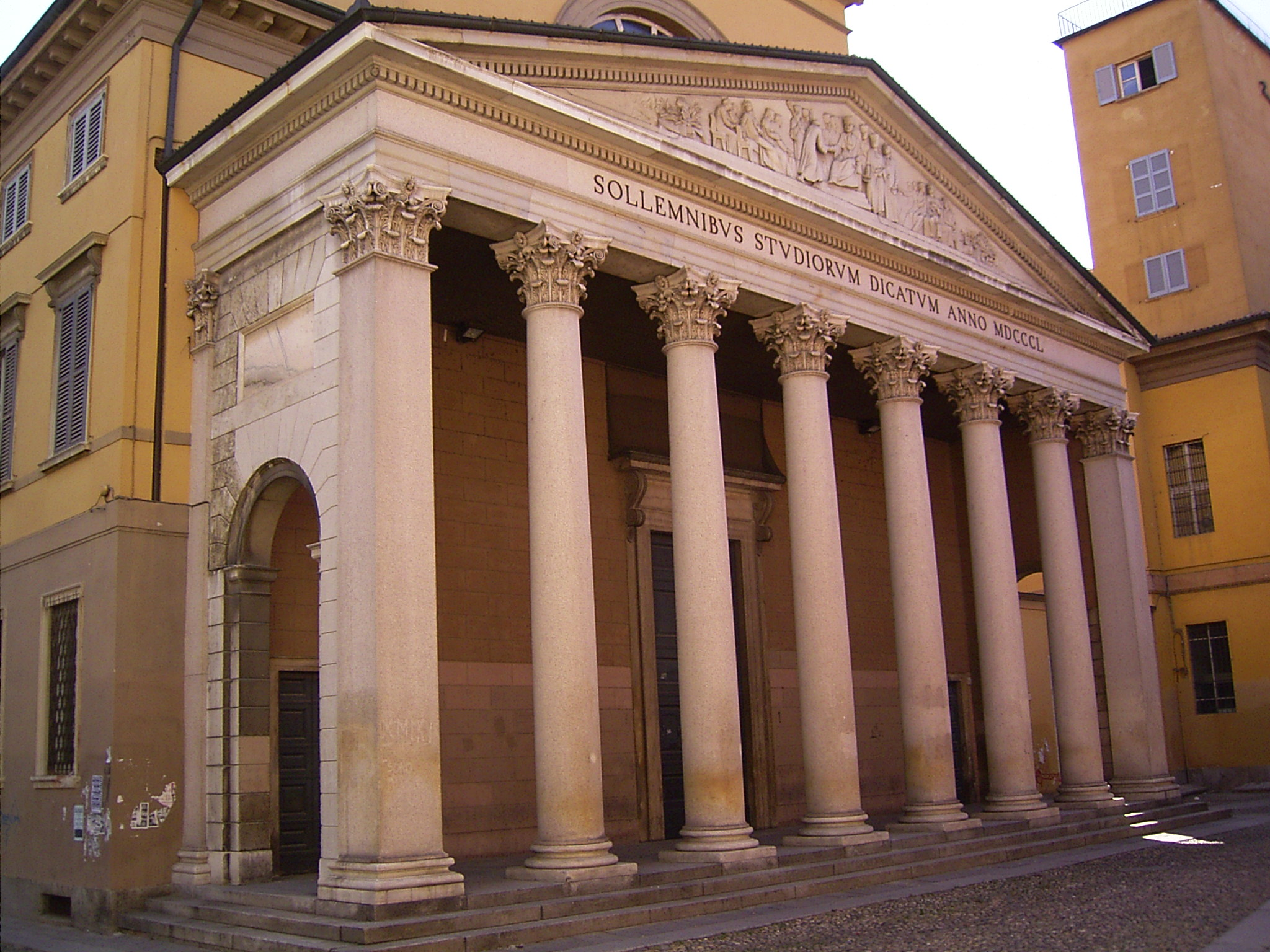
The University of Pavia's Aula Magna

People born in Pavia include:

- Honorata of Pavia (?–500), italian saint
- Giovanni Antonio Amadeo (1447–1522), sculptor, engineer and architect
- Caterina Assandra (c. 1590 – after 1618), composer and Benedictine nun
- Bernardus Papiensis (pre-1150 – 18 September 1213), canonist and bishop
- Donato Conte de' Bardi (active 1426 – died 1450/1451), painter
- Belbello da Pavia (died c. 1470), painter
- Monica Boggioni (born 5 August 1998), Paralympic swimmer
- Luigi Valentino Brugnatelli (1761–1818), chemist
- Federico Burdisso (born 20 September 2001), swimmer
- Gerolamo Cardano (1501–1576), scientist
- Ines Castellani Fantoni Benaglio, also known by the pseudonym of Memini (1849–1897), writer
- Benedetto Cairoli (1825–1889), twice head of the government
- Alberto Carpani (23 April 1956 – 11 May 2020), singer
- Carlo M. Cipolla (1922–2000), economic historian
- Francesco Corbetta (1615–1681), guitar virtuoso, teacher and composer
- Antonio Luigi Gaudenzio Giuseppe Cremona (7 December 1830 – 10 June 1903), mathematician
- Tranquillo Cremona (1837–1878), painter
- Pietro Candido Decembrio (in Latin, Petrus Candidus Decembrius) (1399–1477), humanist
- Vincenzo degli Azani (died 16 July 1557), painter
- Aimone Duce (15th century), painter
- Epiphanias, 6th century saint
- Lorenzo Fasolo (1463–1518), painter
- Frederick V of Hohenstaufen (1164 – around 1170), duke of Swabia
- Gaetano Fraschini (1816– 1887), tenor
- Virginia Giorgi (1914–1991), gymnast
- Paolo Gorini (1813–1881), mathematician, professor, scientist and politician
- Carlo Alessandro Guidi (1650–1712), lyric poet
- Pope John XIV (Latin: Ioannes XIV; died 20 August 984), born Pietro Canepanova, bishop of Rome
- Lanfranc (c. 1005–1089), abbot and Archbishop of Canterbury
- Liutpert (or Liutbert) (died 702), Lombard king of Italy
- Liutprand of Cremona (c. 920–972), historian, diplomat and Bishop of Cremona
- Gina Elena Zefora Lombroso (1872–1944), physician, writer, psychiatrist and criminologist
- Bernardino Lunati (1452–1497), Roman Catholic cardinal
- Ambrogio Maestri (born 1970), operatic baritone
- Germana Malabarba (1913–2002), gymnast
- Enrica Malcovati (1894–1990), Classical philologist
- Cristoforo Mantegazza (c. 1430–1482), sculptor
- Carla Marangoni (1915–2018), gymnast
- Carlo Giuseppe Matteo Marangoni (1840–1925), physicist
- Pasquale Massacra (1819–1849), painter
- Mino Milani (1928–2022), writer, cartoonist, journalist and historian
- Mattia Bruno Moreni (1920–1999), sculptor and painter
- Cesare Mori (1871–1942), prefect
- Andrea Carlo Moro (born 24 July 1962), linguist, neuroscientist and novelist
- Claudia Muzio (1889–1936), opera singer
- Tiziana Nisini (born 18 October 1975), politician
- Mario Pascal (1896–1949), applied mathematician, specializing in fluid mechanics and aerodynamics
- Pietro Pavesi (1844–1907), professor of zoology
- Max Pezzali (1967), singer-songwriter
- Pietro Romualdo Pirotta (1853–1936), professor of botany
- Maria Poiani Panigati (born 17 March 1982), Paralympic swimmer
- Luigi Porta (1800–1875), surgeon and professor
- Giovanni Marchese di Provera, or Johann Provera (1736–1804). He served in the Habsburg army.
- Andrea Re (born 15 November 1963), lightweight rower
- Arturo Riccardi (1878–1966), admiral
- Manfredi Rizza (born 26 April 1991), canoeist
- Luigi Robecchi Bricchetti (1855–1926), explorer, geographer, cartographer and naturalist
- Andrea Rocchelli (1983–2014), freelance photojournalist
- Alessandro Rolla (1757 –1841), viola and violin virtuoso, and composer
- Rotruda of Pavia (died after March 945), noblewoman
- Mauro Ruscóni (1776–1849), physician and zoologist
- Pier Francesco Sacchi (known active 1512–1520), painter
- Bianca Maria Sforza (1472–1510), Queen of Germany and Italy, and empress of the Holy Roman Empire
- Francesco Maria Sforza (30 January 1491 – 1512), nobleman
- Ippolita Maria Sforza (26 January 1493 – 1501), noblewoman
- Giuseppe Simoni (1944), biologist and scientist
- Giovanni Spertini (1821–1895), sculptor
- Giovanni Angelo Testagrossa (1470–1530), lutenist and singer
- Giovanni Battista Traverso (1878–1955), mycologist and plant pathologist
- Carolina Tronconi (1913–2008), gymnast
- Ines Vercesi (1916–1997), gymnast
- Gian Galeazzo Visconti (1351–1402), first duke of Milan
- Valentina Visconti (1371–1408), countess of Vertus, and duchess consort of Orléans
- Violante Visconti (1354–1386), noblewoman
- Franco Vittadini (1884–1948), composer and conductor
- Rita Vittadini (1914–2000), gymnast
- Camillo Zemi (1898–1959), discus thrower and hammer thrower
- Ambrogio Maestri (* 1970), Bariton

People who have lived in Pavia include:

- St. Alexander Sauli (1591–1592), Bishop of Pavia
- Alessandro Volta (1745–1827), scientist and inventor of the battery
- Simion Bărnuțiu (1808–1864), philosopher and politician
- Giacomo Trécourt (1812–1882), Italian painter
- Camillo Golgi (1843–1926), biologist and Nobel laureate
- Giovanni de Ventura (fl. 1479), plague doctor
- Riccardo Pampuri (1897–1930), saint and medical doctor
- Ugo Foscolo (1778–1827), Italian writer, revolutionary and poet
- Dionysios Solomos (1798–1857), national poet of Greece
- Zaira Ollano (1904–1997), physicist
- Dante Troisi (1920–1989), writer and judge

Among the scholars who studied or taught at the University of Pavia: playwright and librettist Carlo Goldoni (1707–1793), Italian Renaissance polymath Gerolamo Cardano, mathematician Gerolamo Saccheri (1667–1733), Italian writer and revolutionary Ugo Foscolo, Alessandro Volta the inventor of the battery, biologist and physiologist Lazzaro Spallanzani (1729–1799), anatomist Antonio Scarpa (1752–1832), physician Carlo Forlanini (1847–1918), the Nobel laureate biologist Camillo Golgi, the Nobel laureate chemist Giulio Natta (1903–1979) and Italian Philosopher Emanuele Severino (1929–2020).

== See also ==
- Botanical Garden of Pavia
- Pavese
- Cimitero Monumentale di Pavia (Wikimedia Commons)

== Works cited ==
- Arnaldi, Girolamo. Italy and Its Invaders. Cambridge, Massachusetts: Harvard University Press, 2005. Print.
- Christie, Neil. The Lombards The Ancient Longobards. Cambridge, Massachusetts: Basil Blackwell Inc., 1995. Print.
- Dale, Sharon (2001). "A house divided: San Pietro in Ciel d'Oro in Pavia and the politics of Pope John XXII". Journal of Medieval History. 27 (1): 55–77. doi:10.1016/S0304-4181(00)00016-6. S2CID 153446043.
- Geary, Patrick J. Readings in Medieval History, vol. 1 Toronto: University of Toronto Press, 2010. Print.
- Moorhead, John. Theoderic in Italy. Oxford: Clarendon Press, 1992. Print.
- Paul the Deacon. History of the Lombards. Translated by William Dudley Foulke, edited by Edward Peters. Originally published in 1907 by the University of Pennsylvania as History of the Langobards.
- Scott, Leader. The Cathedral Builders The Story of a Great Masonic Guild. London: S, Low, Marston and Company, 1899. Print.
- Thompson, E. A. (1982). Romans and Barbarians The Decline of the Western Empire. Madison, Wisconsin: The University of Wisconsin Press. ISBN 9780299087005. Print.
- Wickham, Chris. Early Medieval Italy: Central Power and Local Society 400 –1000. London: The Macmillan Press Ltd., 1981. Print.
