= Natural History Museum, Pavia =

Natural History Museum
- Museo di Storia Naturale
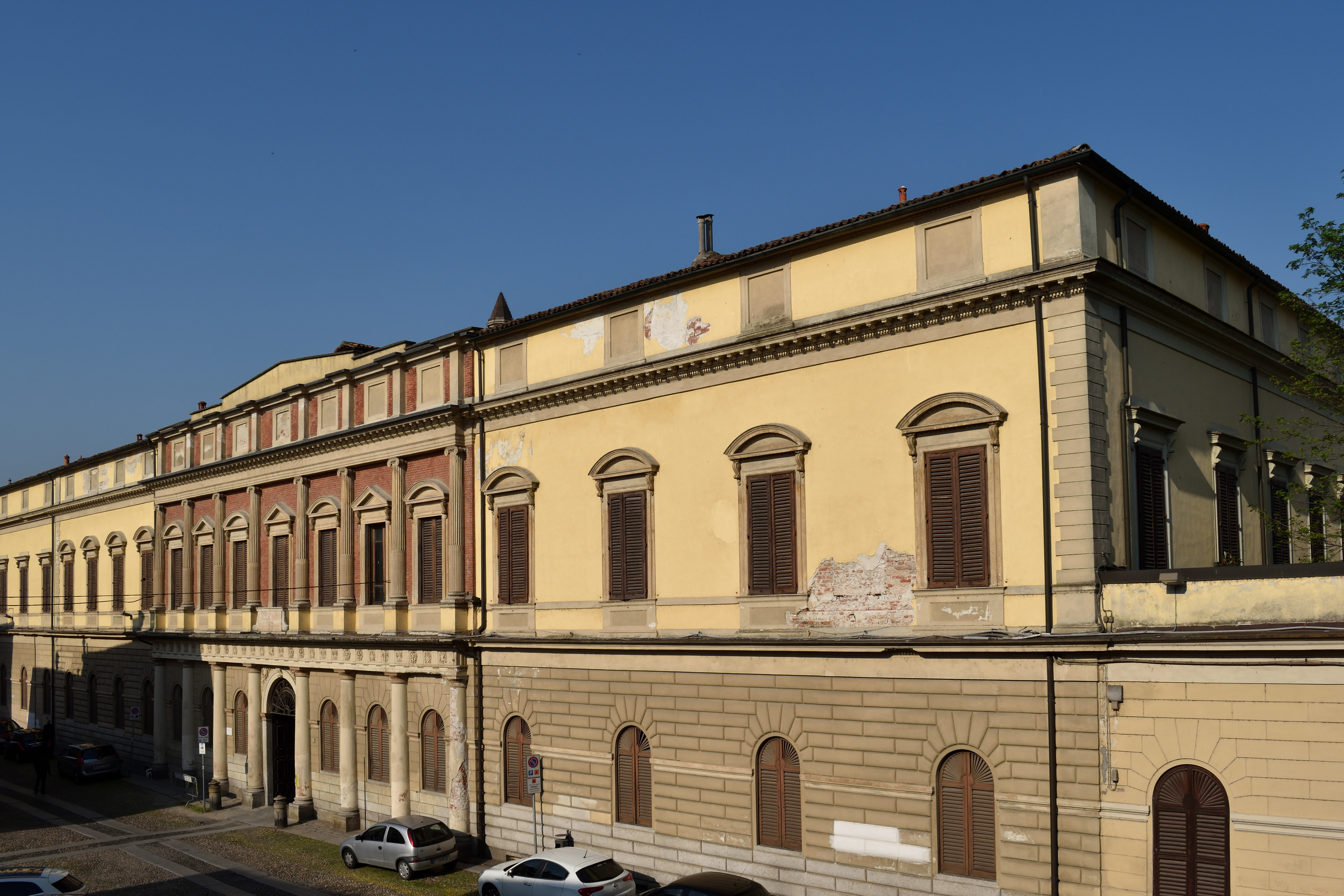
- Established: 1775
- Location: Palazzo Botta Adorno, Piazza Botta 9-10, Pavia, Italy
- Coordinates: 45°11′16.8″N 9°9′0″E
- Type: Natural history museum
- Owner: University of Pavia
- Public transit access: Pavia railway station
- Website: musei.unipv.eu/storianat/

The Natural History Museum (Italian: Museo di Storia Naturale) in Pavia, Italy is a museum displaying many natural history specimens, located in Palazzo Botta Adorno. Founded in 1775, it was one of the oldest museums of natural history in Europe. It currently forms the University of Pavia museum network, along with 5 other museums — the University History Museum, Museum of Electrical Technology, Museum of Archeology, Museum Camillo Golgi and Museum of Mineralogy.

== History ==
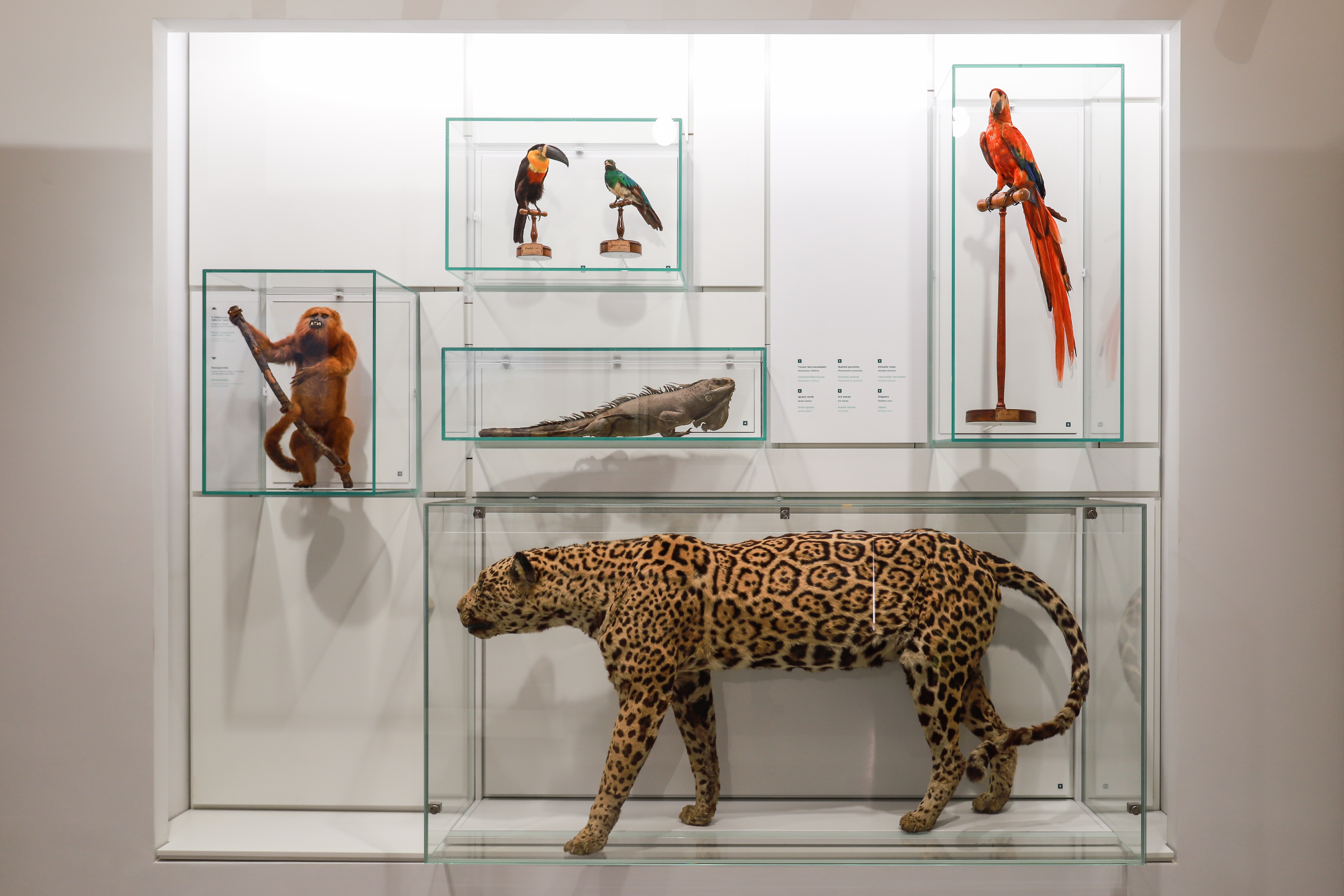
A selection of preserved animal specimens in Natural History Museum, Pavia

The museum was founded as part of the renovation projects by the empress Maria Theresa of Austria for the University of Pavia in 1771. It was set up by Lazzaro Spallanzani, a professor of Natural History in the university. The museum received its first collection, minerals from Vienna, which were donated by the empress Maria Theresa. The collections were kept at Collegio Ghislieri until 1775, when they were moved to Palazzo Centrale, where the collections were catalogued according to the Linnaen classification system.

These collections were kept in the Palazzo Centrale of the university for more than a century. A new wing was added in 1778 for comparative anatomy was added to the existing sections of mineralogy and zoology, containing instruments that had belonged to the surgeon Antonio Scarpa. In 1780, the museum had housed over 24,000 specimens which came from all over the world.

From 1852 to 1874, under the direction of Giuseppe Balsamo Crivelli, the museum expanded its collections thanks to donations and purchases of new specimens, including birds, reptiles, insects and large mammals, including a giraffe and a giant anteater. Each part of the museum became an autonomous museum in 1875 — that of Anatomy was moved into Palace Botta in 1903, likewise the one of Zoology was moved in 1935. The mineralogy section was moved to another part of the Palace.

In 1960, all sections were moved again into the Castle Visconteo, in order to create a unique museum which was opened to the public, but the plan was cancelled. During this time, the collections deteriorated due to lack of maintenance. In 1995, work started to regain and restore materials because, over the years, the collections became degraded. Recently, the museum has been in a phase of planning; the definitive seat of the Natural History Museum is planned to be in the scientific pole of the University.

== Collections ==
The museum is divided into three sections — Zoology, Geopaleontology and Comparative Anatomy. The museum hosts multiple collections including:

=== Spallanzani Collection ===
This section contains the remaining zoological collection curated by Lazzaro Spallanzani. Many of the items from the original collection were damaged due to parasites. The rest of the collection were obtained through donations or personal acquisitions and are still in excellent condition. The collection also includes a "verse guide" from the 1793 opera, L'Invito. Versi sciolti di Dafni orobiano a Lesbia Cidonia, written by Lorenzo Mascheroni, a mathematician and a lecturer in the university.

The Spallanzani collection includes animal specimens preserved in alcohol such as:

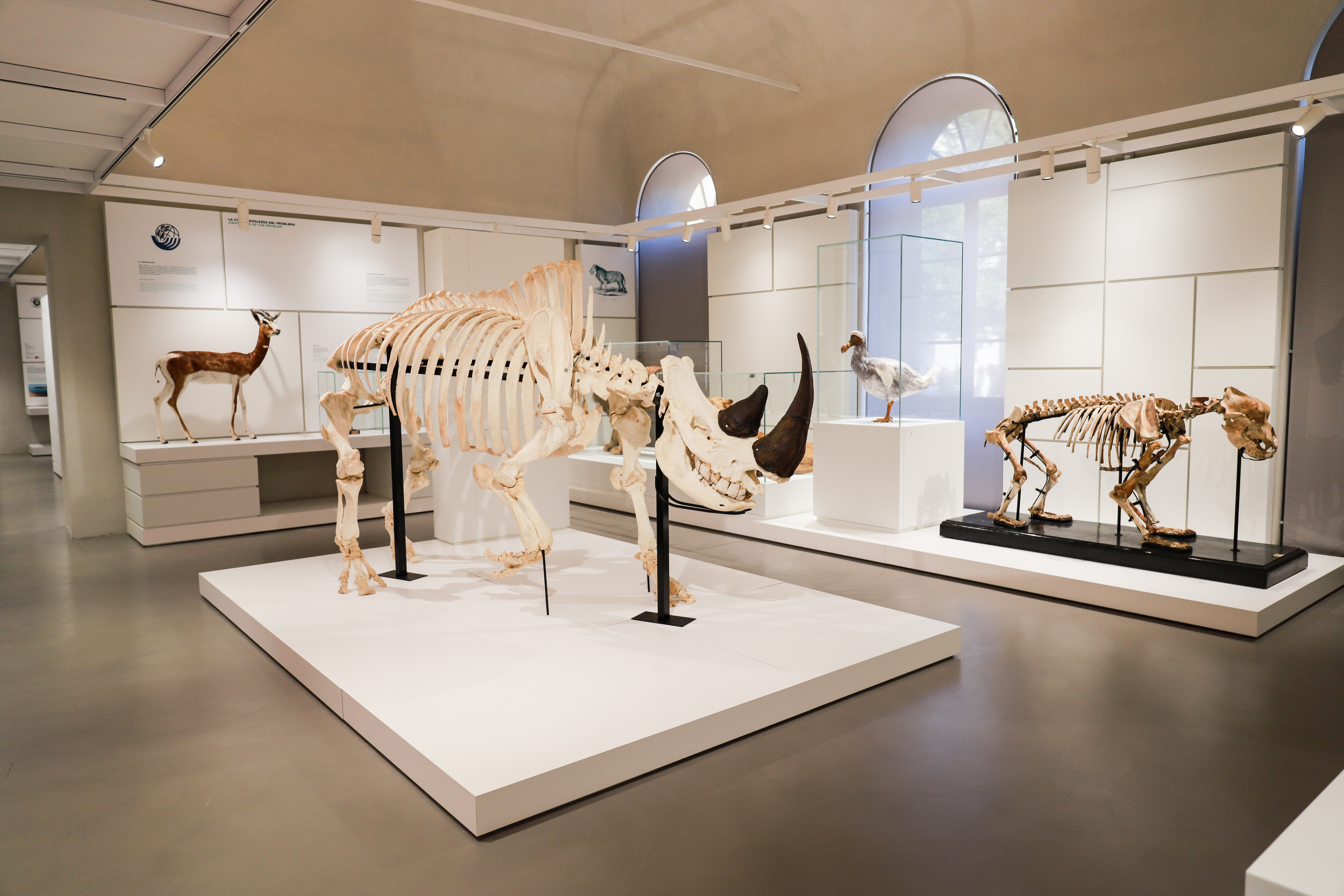
One of the halls of the Kosmos museum with a southern white rhino skeleton in the foreground.

- Nile crocodile (Crocodylus niloticus) acquired by Spallanzani in 1781 during the journey to Marseilles.
- Hippopotamus (Hippopotamus amphibius) from Mantua in 1783.
- Short-finned mako shark (Isurus oxyrhynchus) from the Strait of Messina, purchased by the abbot Gaetano Grano in 1790.
- Bottlenose dolphin (Tursiops truncatus) donated by Count Giacomo Sannazari in 1782.
- Young orangutan (Pongo pygmaeus), acquired in 1786.

In particular, the hippopotamus has a particular history: it is a female specimen, purchased by the Gonzaga in the early seventeenth century, who exhibited it in the Ducal palace in Mantua with the mummy of Rinaldo Bonacolsi on horseback. Around 1700, Rinaldo's mummy was thrown into Lake Mantua and, in 1783, the Austrian government decided to have the hippopotamus brought to the Pavia museum.

=== Zoology Collection ===
The vertebrate collection contains over 5,000 animal specimens. The reptile collection includes a python, anaconda and alligator. Many specimens were collected during scientific explorations in the 19th and 20th century. They are preserved in alcohol, and among them, there's a very rare albino specimen of water snake (Natrix tessellata). Other reptile specimens such as lizards (Lacertidae and Agamidae) were collected by a Pavia explorer, Luigi Robecchi Bricchetti. The Agama robecchii specimen was collected by him at Obbia, Somalia in 1890.

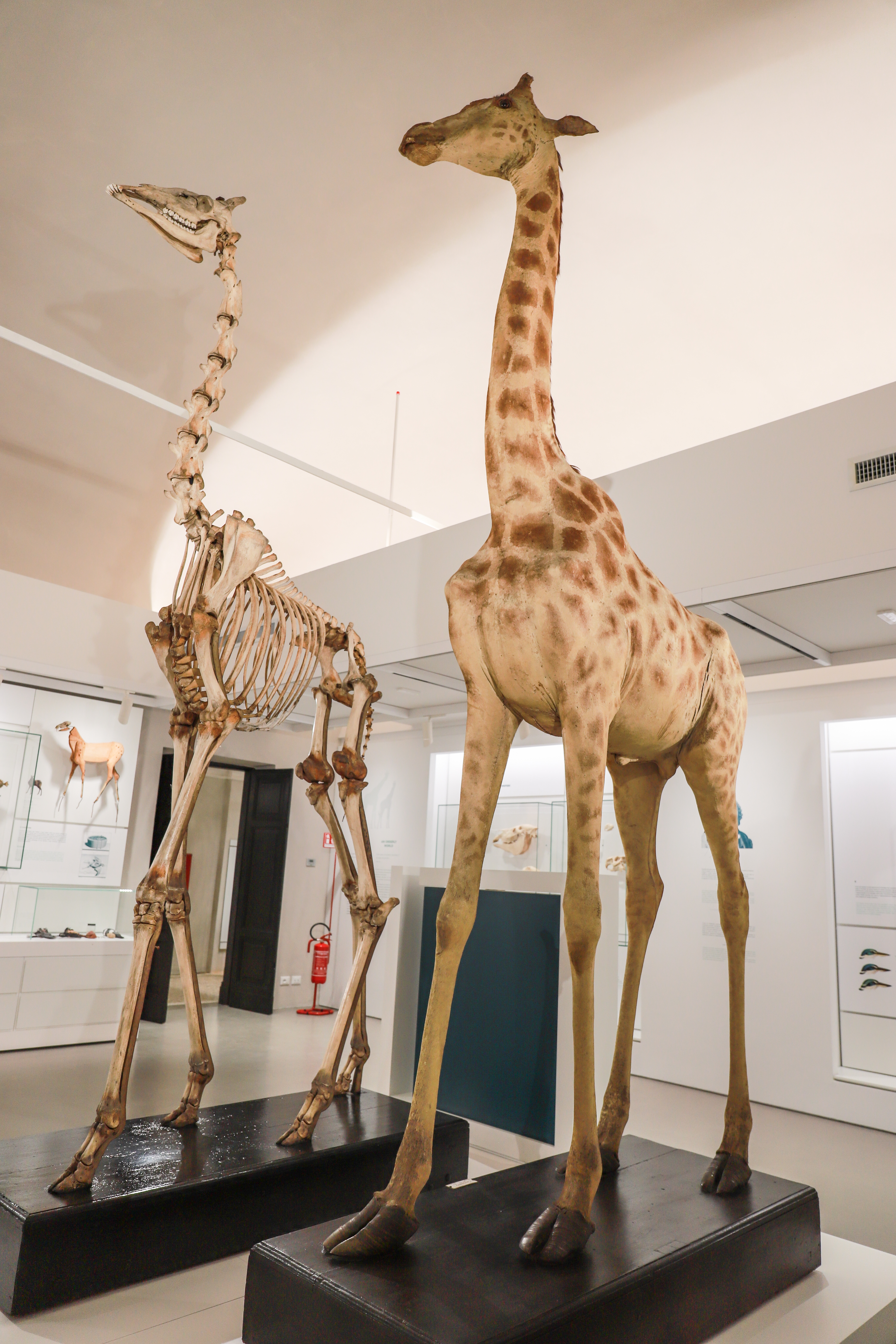
The giraffe skeleton exhibited at Kosmos

The marine and freshwater fish collection consists of the dipnoi fish acquired by Pietro Pavesi and a rare specimen of coelacanth (Latimeria chalumnae), fished in the Mozambique Channel in the early 1970s and donated to the museum by Aga Khan IV Karim.

=== Geopaleontology Collection ===
The Geopaleontology collection was stored at Visconti Castle where it was transferred there in the late 1950s until 2014, when it was moved to Palazzo Botta Adorno. It contains over 30,000 fossil specimens — skeletal parts of invertebrates and vertebrates discovered in Po Valley — which date back the Pliocene and Miocene era. The fossil collections include 65 slabs of fish from Bolca fossiliferous deposit, an original specimen of Ichthyosaurus (Ichthyosaurus quadriscissus) from the Mesozoic era, a pyritized crinoid from the genus Pentacrinus, as well as a complete skeleton of a cave bear (Ursus spelaeus), coming from the Alps of Lombardy. The collections also includes 5,000 rocks and minerals.

=== Comparative Anatomy Collection ===
The Comparative Anatomy collection contains more than 5,000 artifacts including skeletons, specimens and anatomical preparations of mainly vertebrates including an elephant, which underwent restoration in 2014. The elephant specimen is likely the third oldest specimen in the world, after the ones in the museums in Bourges (1803) and Madrid (1778).

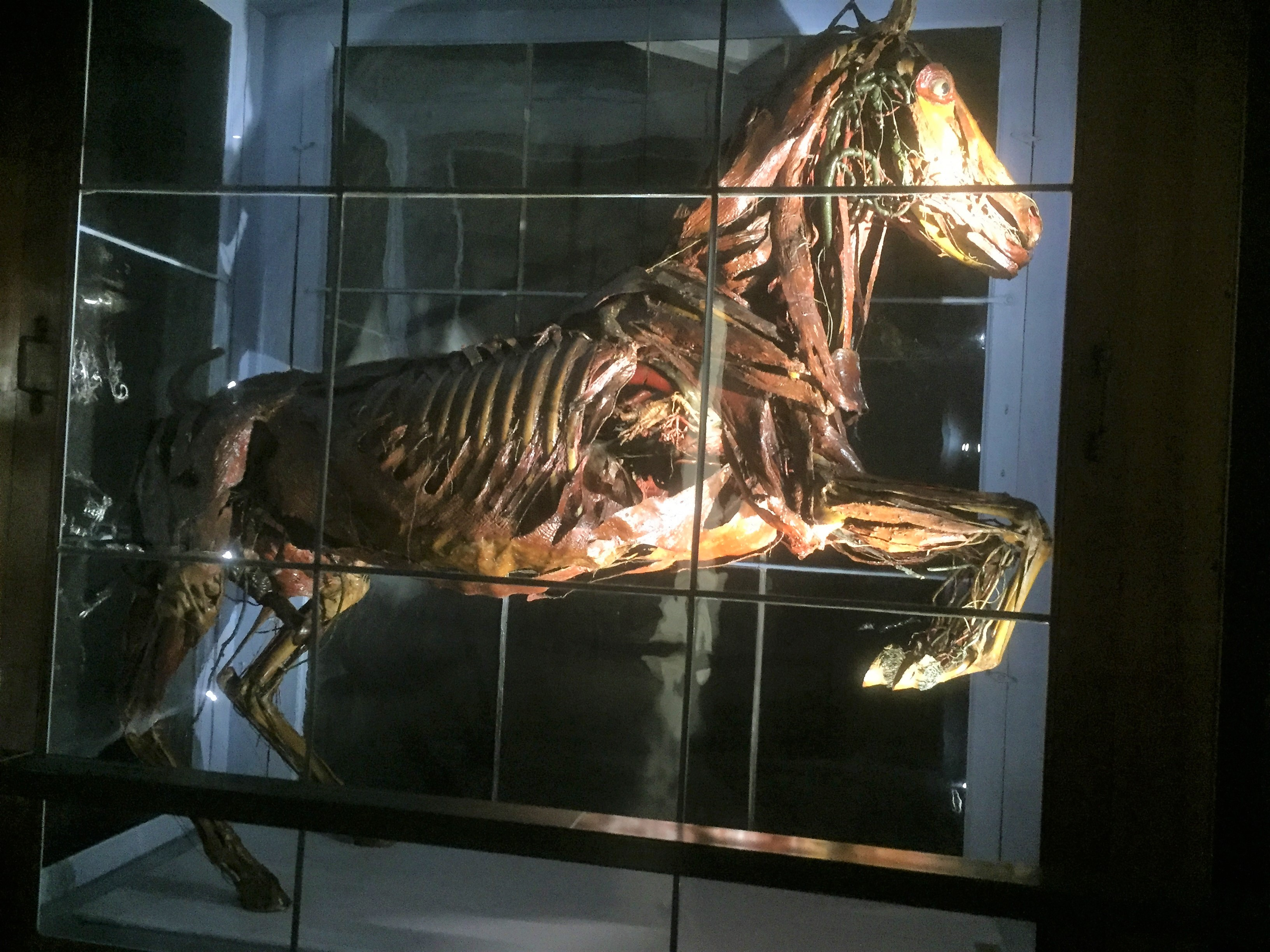
Anatomical preparation of a horse, Giovanni Battista Volpi (c. 1752–1821).

==== Shanti the Elephant ====
In 1772, Jean-Baptiste Chevalier, last French governor of Chandannagar decided to gift an elephant to King Louis XV. The elephant was a two-year-old Asian elephant (Elephas maximus), which left Bengal, India for France on ship which belonged to the Company of Indies. Ten months later, the elephant landed at Lorient in Brittany (Bretagne). It made a long journey on foot, under the watchful eyes of curious crowds, all the way to the Palace of Versailles. There, it remained at the Court of the King as an animal attraction for the guest of the palace and naturalists, among them, Petrus Camper, a Dutch anatomist who eventually published a volume on the natural history of elephants (Camper, 1803).

The elephant died sometime in the night between 24th and 25 September 1782, after falling into the waters of a canal in the park. The body was taken to the Jardin du Roi in Paris and was prominent anatomists, Jean-Claude Mertrud and Edme-Louis Daubenton. The skin was on display in the National Museum of Natural History in Paris. In 1804, Napoleon Bonaparte donated the elephant skin to the Natural History Museum, at the University of Pavia, along with other zoological specimens. The curator of the Museum, Vincenzo Rosa, took care of the creation of the specimen and mounted it in 1812. Due to the museum's policies, the specimen was kept away from the public eye and remained inaccessible for more than two centuries, stored at Visconti Castle from 1960 to 2014.

In December 2014, the elephant specimen was transferred to Palazzo Botta Adorno for restoration. It underwent careful cleaning and was subjected to major restoration work in order to repair the damage suffered over the centuries caused by mold and wear and tear. The restoration project was part of a Universitiamo campaign, which was the crowd funding platform for the University of Pavia. The restoration was completed with additional funds from Regione Lombardia.

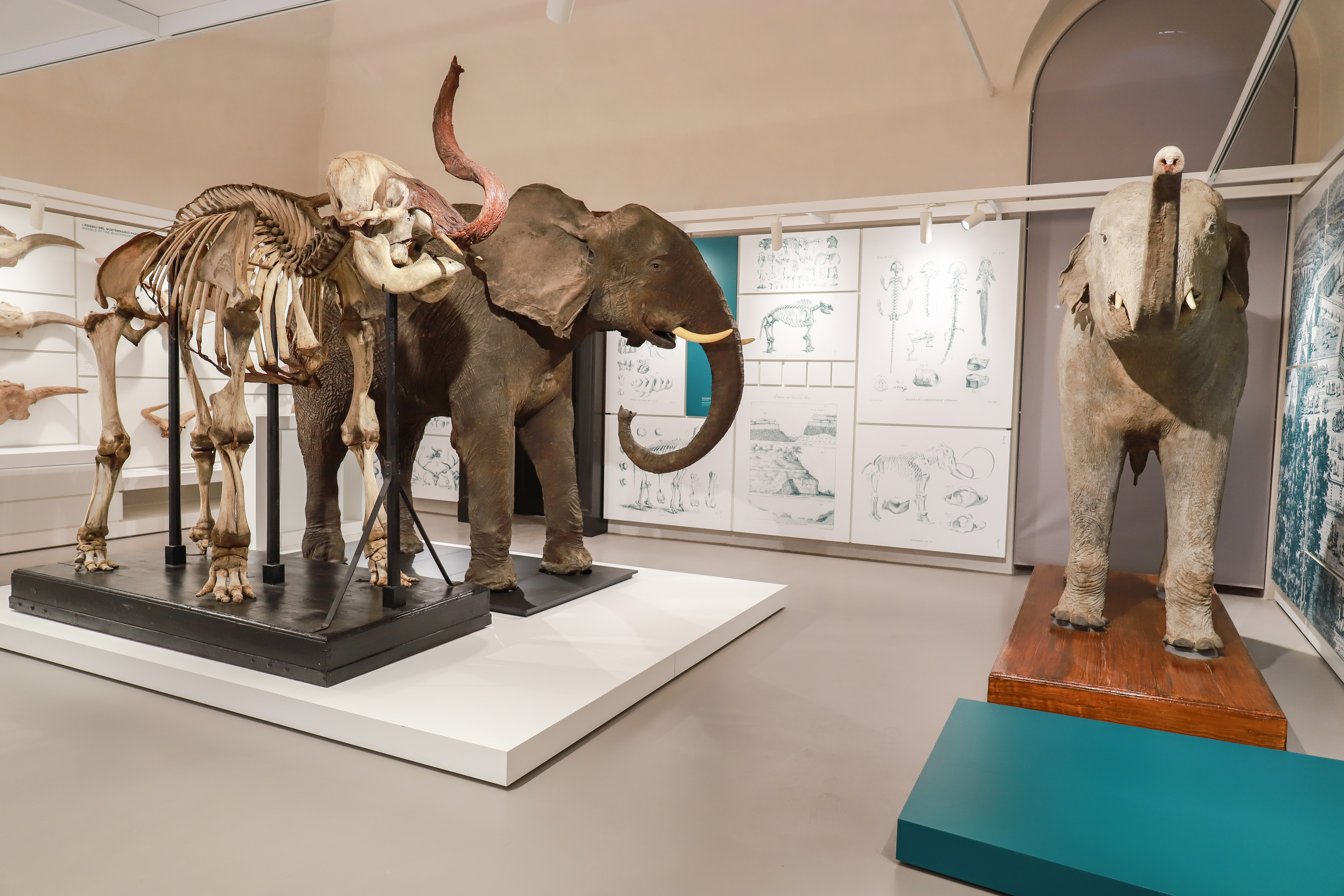
One of the rooms of the Kosmos museum with the skeleton of an African elephant and a specimen of the same species in taxidermy and on the right the Asian elephant donated by Napoleon

In the spring of 2015, after more than 60 years of being stored in the attic of Visconti Castle in Pavia, the elephant was put on display at the University of Pavia. The elephant exhibition was held at Palazzo Centrale from 30 April to 31 October 2015 and attracted more than 10,000 visitors. On 27 October 2015, the elephant was named Shanti, which was chosen by Carlo Violani, one of the donors of the 2015 Universitiamo campaign.

On 8 April 2017, the university arranged for an event "A Day for the Elephant" (Italian: Un giorno da Elefante) at Palazzo Botta Adorno, which included a tour of the Natural History Museum.

A book on the history of the elephant specimen was written by Paolo Mazzarello, a professor of History of Medicine in the University of Pavia, titled "The Elephant from Napoleon, an animal who wants to be free" (Italian: L'elefante di Napoleone, un animale che voleva essere libero).

== See also ==
- University of Pavia
