= University History Museum, University of Pavia =

University History Museum
- Museo per la Storia dell'Università
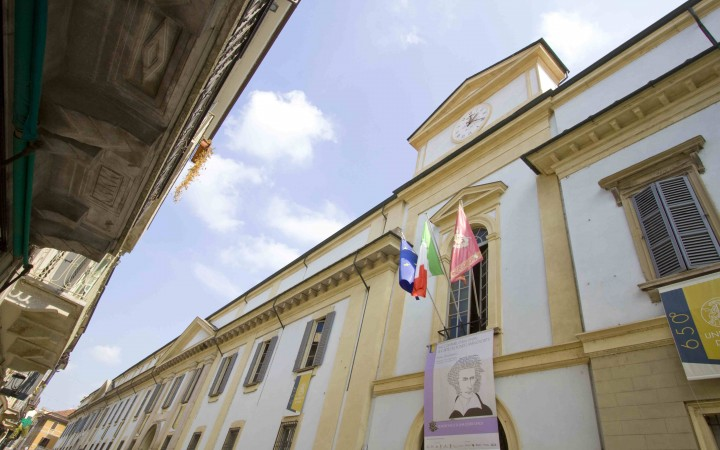
- Palazzo Centrale which hosts the University History Museum
- Established: 1937
- Location: Palazzo Centrale, Via Strada Nuova 65, Pavia, Italy
- Coordinates: 45.187°N 9.156°E
- Type: Historical museum
- Owner: University of Pavia
- Public transit access: Pavia railway station
- Website: https://museoperlastoria.unipv.it/

The University History Museum of the University of Pavia (Italian: Museo per la Storia dell'Università) is a museum displaying memorabilia related to the history of the university, particularly in the fields of physics and medicine, when students were taught by prominent scholars such as Antonio Scarpa and Camillo Golgi or the physicist Alessandro Volta.

The museum was founded in 1936 and is currently located at Palazzo Centrale. It currently forms the University of Pavia museum network, along with five other museums — the Natural History Museum, Museum of Electrical Technology, Museum of Archeology, Museum Camillo Golgi and Museum of Mineralogy.

== History ==
The origin of the museum could be traced back to the end of the 18th century during the age of enlightenment era, when empress Maria Theresa of Austria ordered the reformation of the university teachings and structures. A Teaching Plan (Italian: Piano Didattico) and a Scientific Plan (Italian: Piano Scientifico) were approved by the Magistrate of the General Studies in 1771 and 1773, respectively. These plans regulated students' access to faculties and encouraged initiatives to invite prominent scholars to teach in the university. For this purpose, new structures were created — library, anatomical theater, physics theater, natural history museum, chemistry laboratory, botanical garden and cabinets anatomy and experimental physics. In 1783, when Antonio Scarpa took up his chair in Pavia, he ordered a construction of a modern anatomy theatre where performed dissections could be witnessed by others. The museum was set up next to this theatre.

In 1929, after an exhibition in Florence which displayed some artifacts from the university's collection, the university decided to open its own museum of history. In 1932, the museum was founded to accommodate the items which were kept in the Palazzo Botta Adorno, on the exhibition on the first anniversary of the death of Antonio Scarpa, founder of the Anatomical School of Pavia. The exhibition was organized by Antonio Pensa, president of the Fourth National Congress of Anatomy and Professor of Human Anatomy at the University of Pavia. It revolved around the collection of items from Antonio Scarpa — autographs and writings, anatomical preparations by Scarpa and other anatomists as Giacomo Rezia and Bartolomeo Panizza, which were preserved in the Anatomical Museum for a century until it was moved to Palazzo Botta Adorno in 1902.

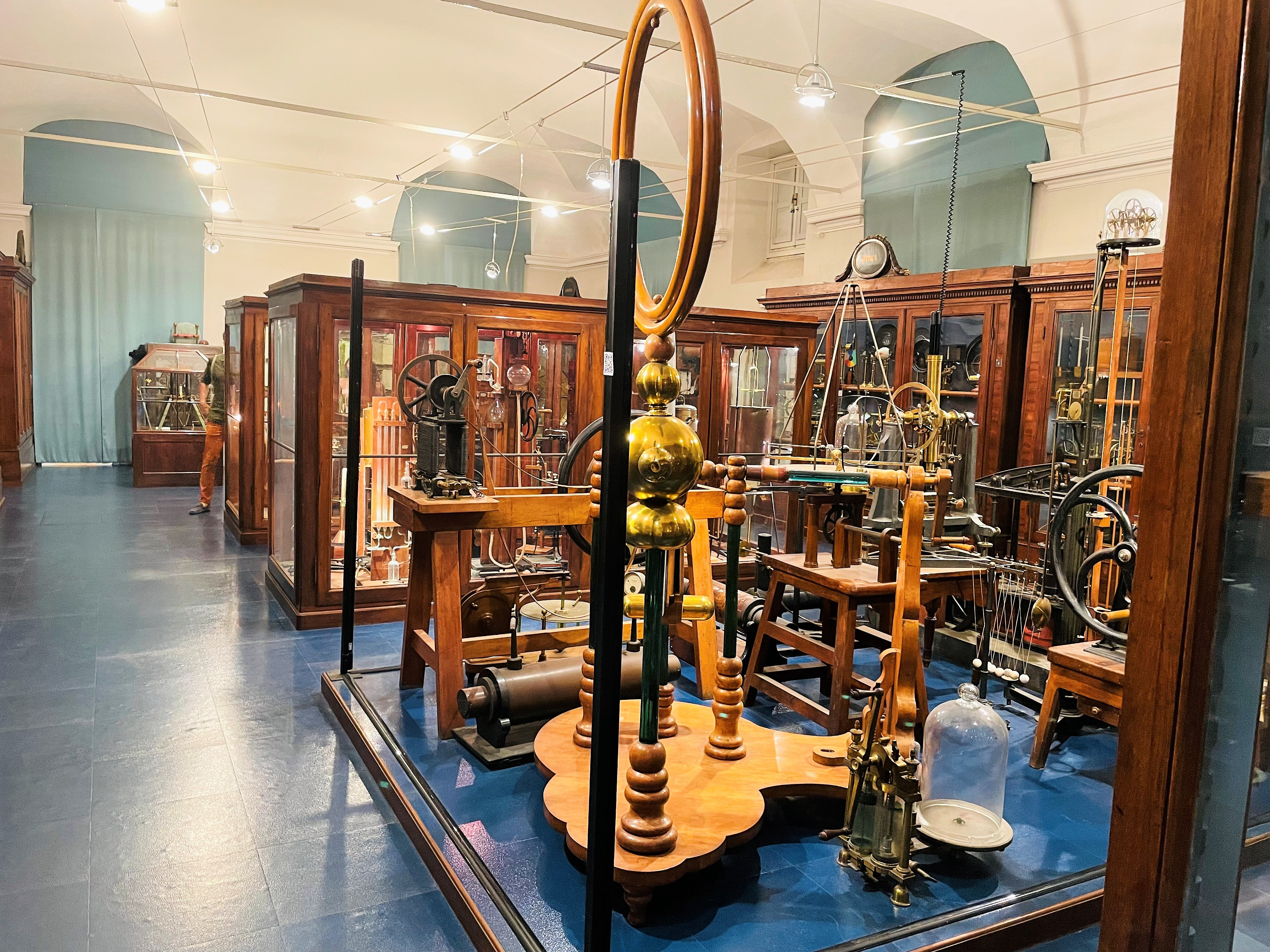
Ancient instruments for the study of Physics (18th-19th century).

The current museum was officially opened in 1936 and gradually expanded over the years, thanks to donations from the heirs of Golgi, which included his manuscripts, notes for lectures and especially, the original certificate of the Nobel Prize he won in 1906. During the war, the museum was closed in order to keep the collections safe, but after 1945, it was reopened and new items were continued to be added to its collections.

In addition to anatomical preparations, physics and surgical instruments as well as documents related to the history of the university, the museum also has many memorabilia which are not normally shown to the public due to space constraints. These items — documents and writings such as the autographs of Volta, Foscolo, Monti, Spallanzani, Moscati, Golgi, Oehl, Brugnatelli, Romagnosi, Cairoli and many others who had contributed to the history of the university — are displayed on rotation or by request.

== Collections ==
The museum is divided into two sections:

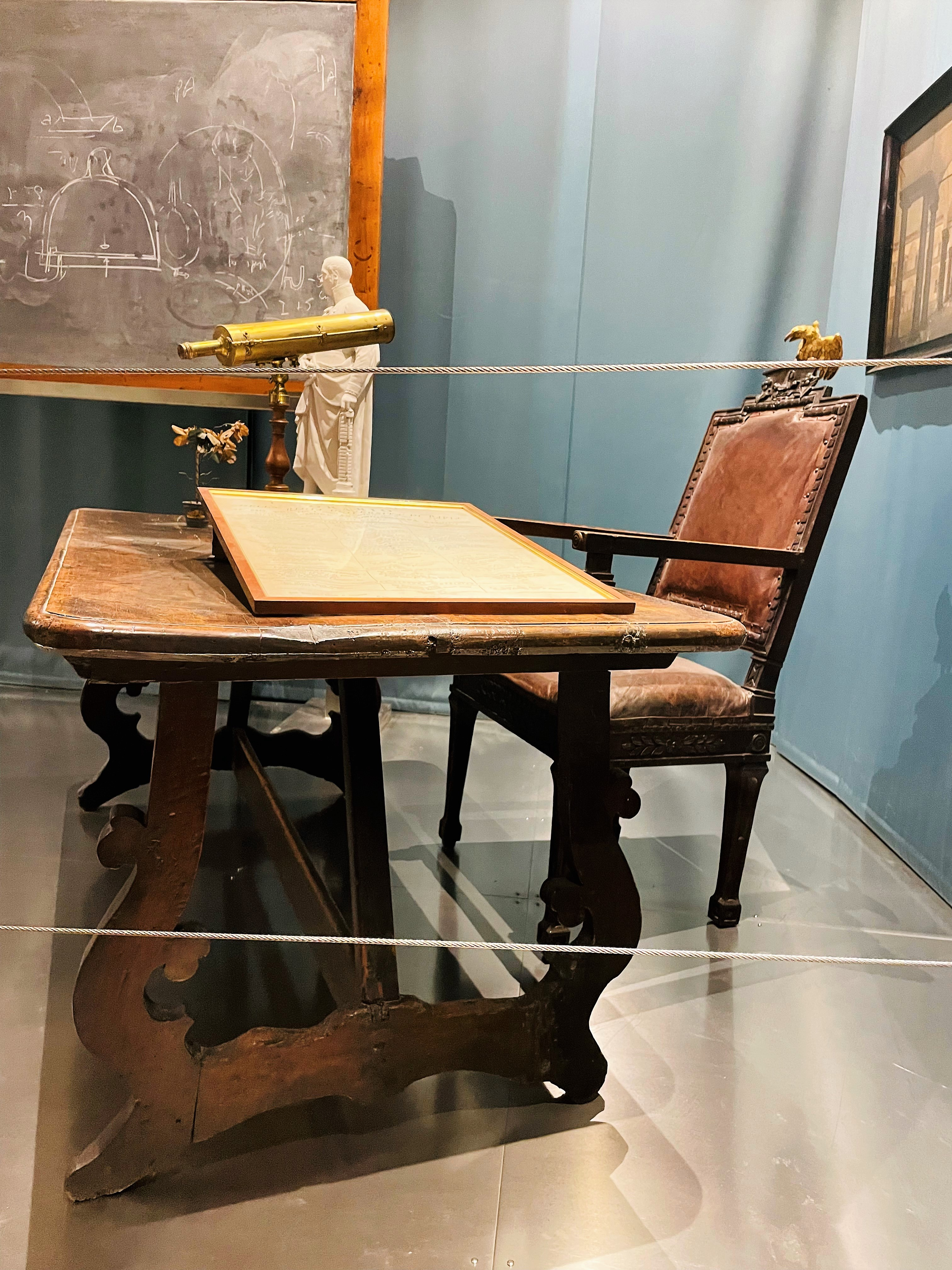
Chair of Alessandro Volta in Sala Volta

=== Physics section ===
The origin of the physics collection dates back to the old Physics Laboratory, founded in 1771 during the reformation by Maria Theresa. The Physics Theater (now Aula Volta) and a tower for meteorological observations were subsequently annexed to the museum. In 1778, Alessandro Volta was appointed as a professor of Experimental Physics and he had been slowly adding numerous instruments purchased during his European travels to the collection. He also added instruments which he had conceived and created with the help of skilled artisans.

Many tools were used by Volta during public exhibitions, held twice a week from December to June. In addition to the students (whom he taught daily), numerous spectators (...usually more than 200, according to his writing, Opere, Appendice XXII). The collection was enriched by Giuseppe Belli (museum director from 1842 to 1860) with his own instruments, and by Giovanni Cantoni (museum from 1860 to 1893). An inventory drawn up shortly after his death described more than 2,000 pieces of instruments. Unfortunately, some of these instruments were either destroyed in the fire at the exhibition pavilion in 1899 at Como, during the centennial celebration of the collection or were lost in removals over the years, the last of which was due to the Second World War. The remaining 1,000 pieces were now kept in this section.

This section is divided into two rooms — Gabinetto di Volta, which was inaugurated on 20 March 1999 during the bicentennial celebration of the collection, and Gabinetto di Fisica dell'Ottocento.

==== Gabinetto di Volta ====
The section hosts a number of collections of instruments used by Alessandro Volta during his tenure in the University of Pavia. Two work tables, which he used, host numerous instruments he used to investigate the properties of an electrical charge — electrophores, gold-leaf electroscope, condensing electroscope, electrometers, conductors and capacitors in various sizes and shapes. The collection also includes several Leyden jars, Nairne's electrostatic generator, eudiometers, Volta's pistol and a device to study gas expansions.

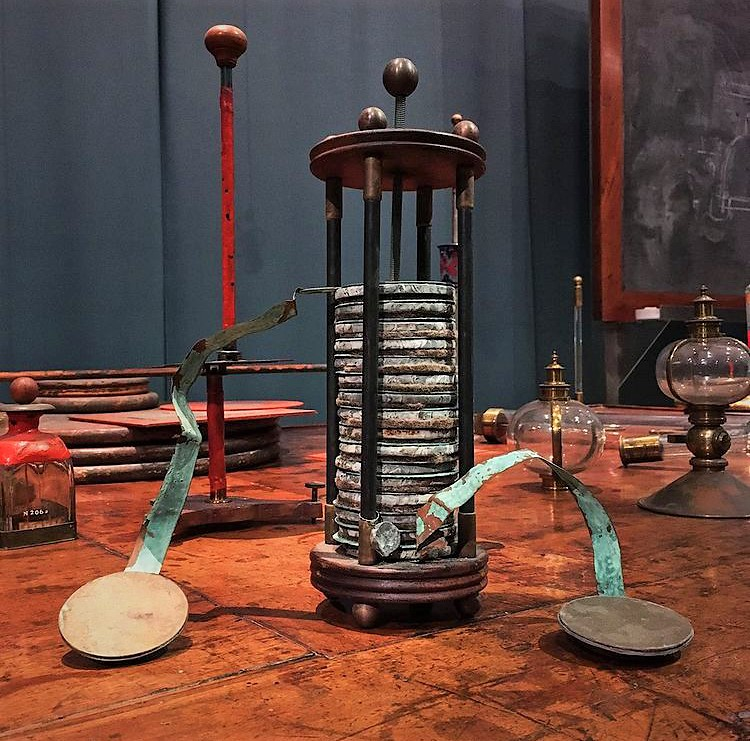
Voltaic pile, University History Museum of the University of Pavia.

At the centre of the room, there's a display of mechanical and pneumatic instruments which belonged to Ugo Foscolo high school in Pavia — instruments for studying motion on an inclined plane and elastic shocks, pulleys, pumps, fountain and a device for the study of air resistance. These instruments were purchased or created by Volta, which were transferred in the middle of the 19th century to the high school during the reformation of the scholastic system. The collection also includes electrology (Lane and Leyden jars, magnets and dry cells), mechanical and thermological (precision hydrometer, Laplace and Lavoisier calorimeters, thermometers and barometers, a Newton tube), optical (mirrors, lenses, prisms, microscopes and a telescope) devices as well as two devices which represent measurements of a meter and a kilogram .

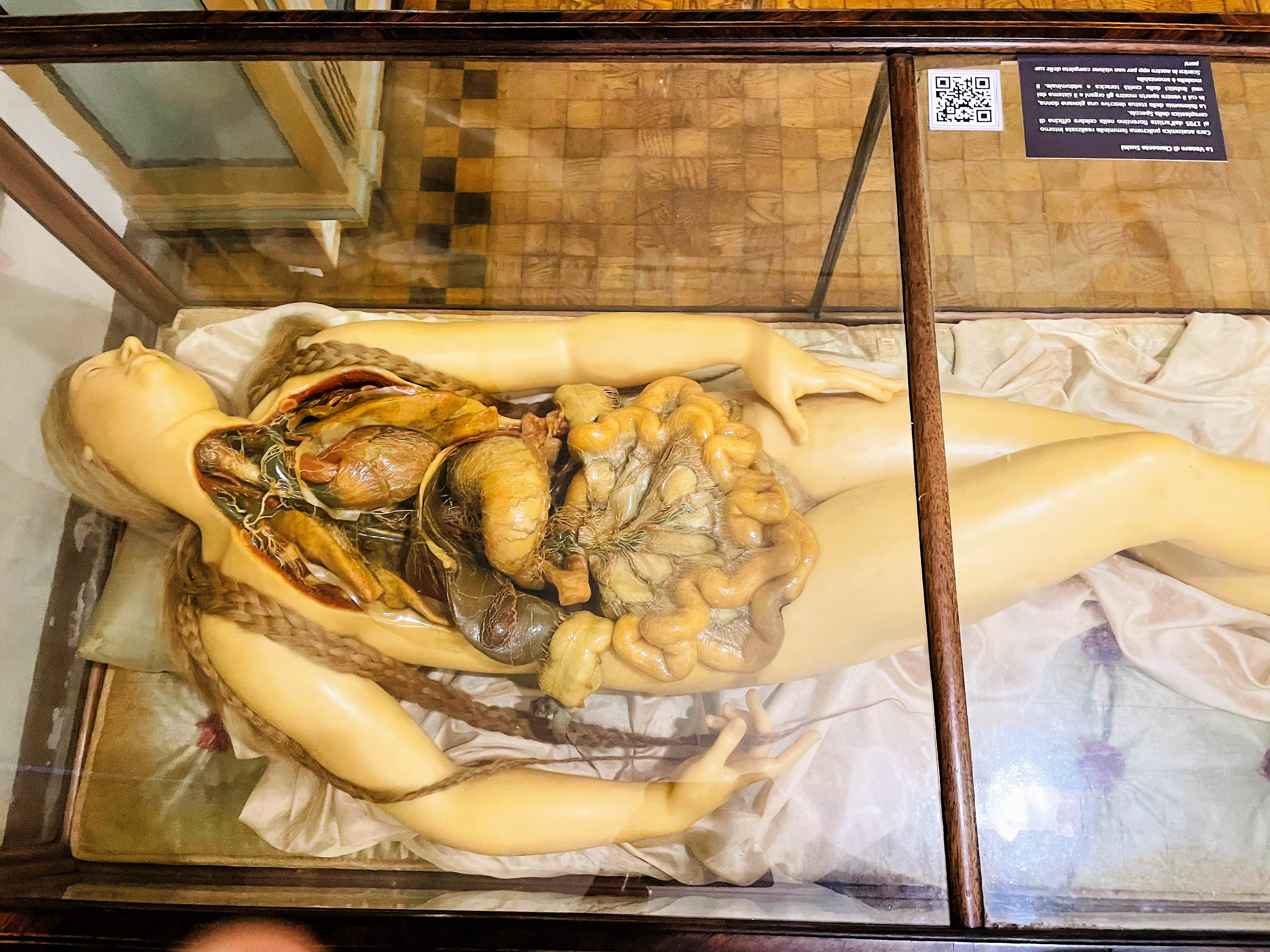
Clemente Susini, anatomical model, 1794.

==== Gabinetto di Fisica dell'Ottocento ====
This section hosts a number of instruments used by Volta's successors while occupying the Physics chair. There are more than 600 instruments, some of them are unique. Giuseppe Belli added many instruments to the collection, many were his own, including an electrostatic induction generator, a magneto-electric motor, a modified Bohnenberger electrometer and an electrostatic generator. This massive collection were further expanded by his successors, Giovanni Cantoni and others who followed after him.

The exhibit is divided into the following thematic collections — electrical, optics, pneumatics, thermology, mechanics and geodesy. Some of these instruments include solar microscope, a Silbermann device, a Foucault pendulum, a Thomson ammeter, a Regnault hypsometer as well an Atwood machine, various coils, resistors, capacitors, electromagnets, electrometers, spectrometers, photometers, sextants, theodolites and rings. This section also includes a hyperbaric chamber designed and used by Carlo Forlanini between 1901 and 1918 for inducing artificial pneumothorax — which was the first successful cure for tuberculosis.

=== Medical section ===
The medical section is divided into three rooms named after distinguished medical scholars who taught in Pavia — anatomist Antonio Scarpa, pathologist and surgeon Luigi Porta and histologist and pathologist Camillo Golgi. These memorabilia were a part of Cabinet Anatomy which was hosted by the old Anatomical Museum. The collection was started by Giacomo Rezia, then by Antonio Scarpa, Bartolomeo Panizza and Giovani Zoja. This section hosts a collection of anatomical and histological specimens, as well as instruments used by anatomists who have taught in the university on shelves built by Scarpa himself in the 18th century.

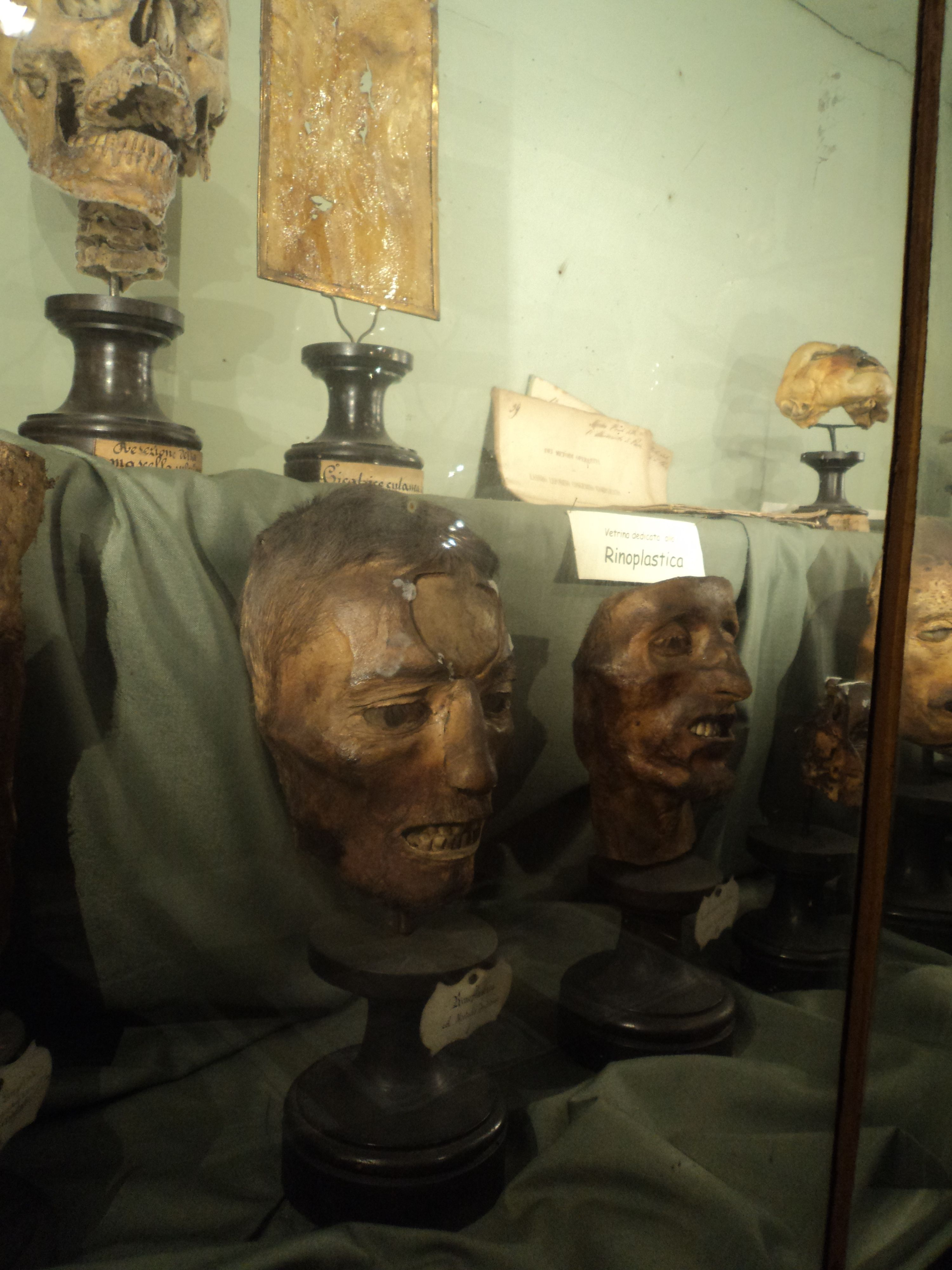
Skull specimens used by Luigi Porta for rhinoplasty experiments

==== Sala Porta ====
This section mainly displays memorabilia related to Luigi Porta and his works in the university. Specimens, handwritten documents and drawings related to his work on the pathological changes in the arteries after ligation or compressions —which became the origin of vascular surgery, are part of this collection.

Specimens of vessels and ligatures, as well as more than 800 pathology cards are also on display. Other memorabilia include a series of skulls specimens which Luigi Porta performed his rhinoplasty experiments on during the 1840s.

==== Sala Golgi ====
This section mainly contains memorabilia related to Camillo Golgi and his work in the university. Among them are the original certificate of his Nobel Prize for Medicine in 1906, the microscopy slides from his infamous black reaction which allowed visualization of neurons for the first time and the two microscopes which he used to study them.

Other memorabilia of interest include handwritten documents and illustrations of cells, kidneys, his studies on malaria as well as some manuscripts and notes which he used for his general pathology lectures.

The collection also includes other documents and manuscripts related to Adelchi Negri's discovery of rabies and Carlo Forlanini's instruments for inducing artificial pneumothorax.

This section also displays the medical instruments used by Edoardo Porro to perform his first hysterectomy on 21 May 1876 and the anatomical specimens of the parts which he had removed.

==== Sala Scarpa ====
This section mainly contains memorabilia related to Antonio Scarpa and his work in the university. This collection contains many of his printed publications such as those of the inner ear, nerves of the heart, olfactory nerve and the anatomy of inguinal hernia. The anatomical preparations and drawings prepared for demonstration of nasopalatine and olfactory nerves were exhibited at International Congress of Anatomy in Paris in 1781.

There are a number of anatomical and histological samples, most of which were dissected during autopsy and prepared by Antonio Scarpa and his pupils. These samples were taken from patients who died at Policlinico San Matteo at the time. Each sample represented certain diseases and helped develop our understanding of physiology, the study of the function of the human body.

This section also displays two anatomical wax models, which were sculpted by Clemente Susini which was modelled after Felice Fontana's dissections, as well as a collection of skulls from people such as Giovanni Gorini (a math professor), Giuseppe Moretti (director of the botanical garden), Pasquale Massacra (painter), Antonio Bordoni (mathematician) a reproduction cast of the skulls belonging to Ugo Foscolo, Francesco Petrarca, Gian Galeazzo Visconti as well as a plaster cast of Alessandro Volta's unusually large skull.

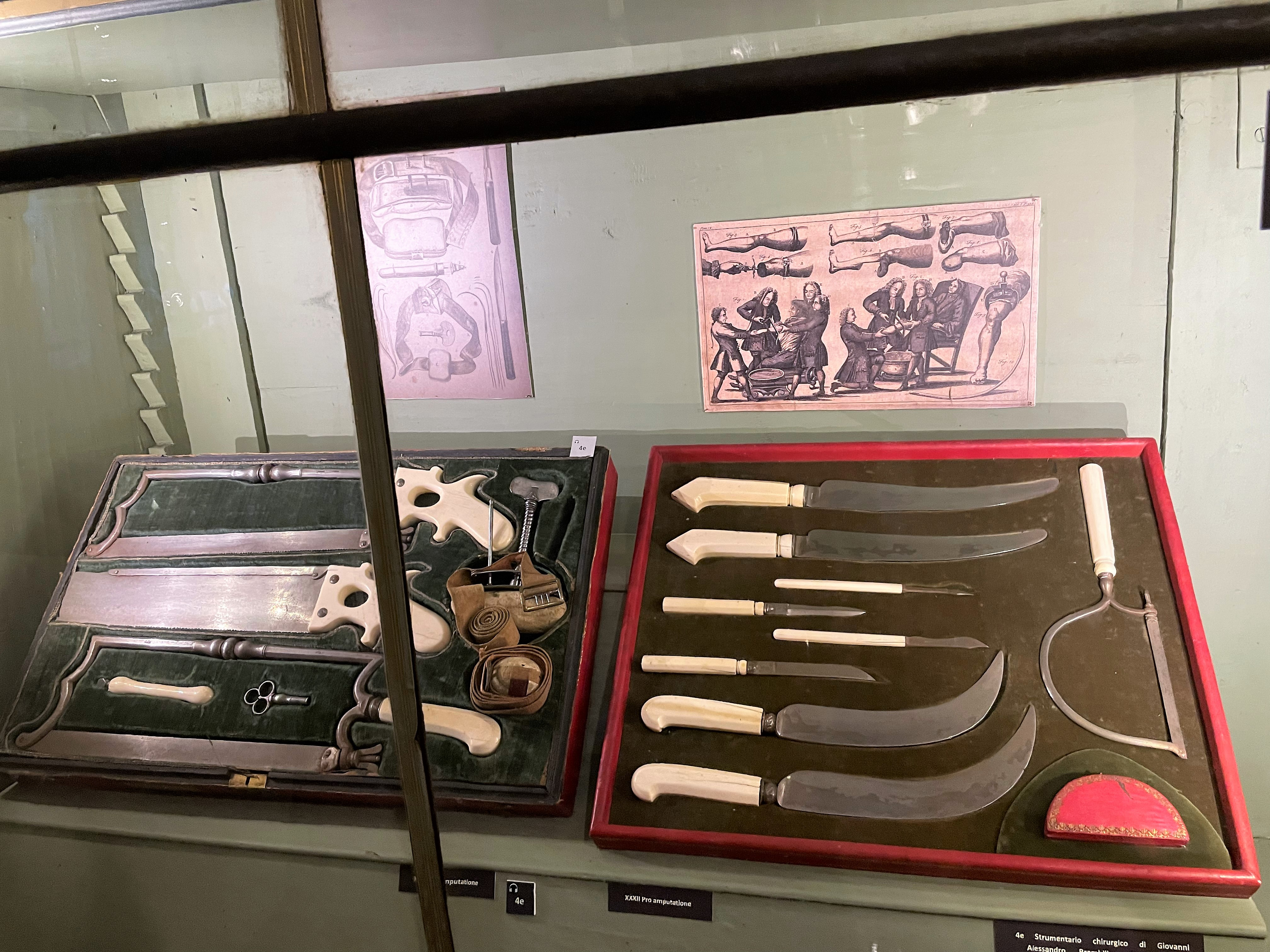
Giovani Alessandro Brambilla's surgical instruments

The collection also includes Antonio Scarpa's severed head, both his kidneys and four of his fingers with blackened nails, all meticulously preserved. Other anatomical samples include the aneurysm that killed mathematician Vincenzo Brunacci in 1818 and the bladder of naturalist Lazzaro Spallanzani, who died of kidney cancer in 1799. Scarpa's chair and ivory surgical dissection instruments donated by Joseph II in 1786 are also part of the museum's collection. Other memorabilia include a number of fetal skeletons from post-natal deaths as well drawings, histological samples by Bartolomeo Panizza and a collection of surgery tools used by Giovanni Alessandro Brambilla, which were listed in his manuscript "Instrumentarium Chirurgicum Militare Austriacum".

== See also ==
- University of Pavia
- List of natural history museums
