= Scarpa's shoe =

Scarpa's shoe was an 18th-century mechanical device developed to treat clubfoot. It never became widely accepted.

It was designed by Antonio Scarpa, an Italian anatomist and surgeon.
