= Luigi Porta =

Italian surgeon and professor

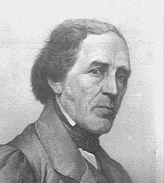

Luigi Porta (4 January 1800 – 10 September 1875) was an Italian surgeon and professor at the University of Pavia. He pioneered the field of vascular surgery and noted collateral circulation following ligation of arteries.

Porta was born in Pavia and received a medical degree from the University of Pavia in 1822 after which he went to Vienna for three years of further study. He received another degree from Pavia in 1826 and became a professor of clinical surgery from 1832, succeeding his teacher, Antonio Scarpa. From 1835 he conducted experiments on animals, examining pathologies induced by ligation of blood vessels. In 1847 he published on his experiments with anaesthesia where chloroform gas held in the bladder of a pig was delivered into the mouth of a patient whose nostrils were closed. Porta wrote a monograph on lithotripsy in 1859. He also contributed specimens and models of surgical instruments to the museum at Pavia. A statue of Porta stands in the University on Corso Strada Nuova.
