= Edoardo Porro =

Italian gynaecologist (1842–1902)

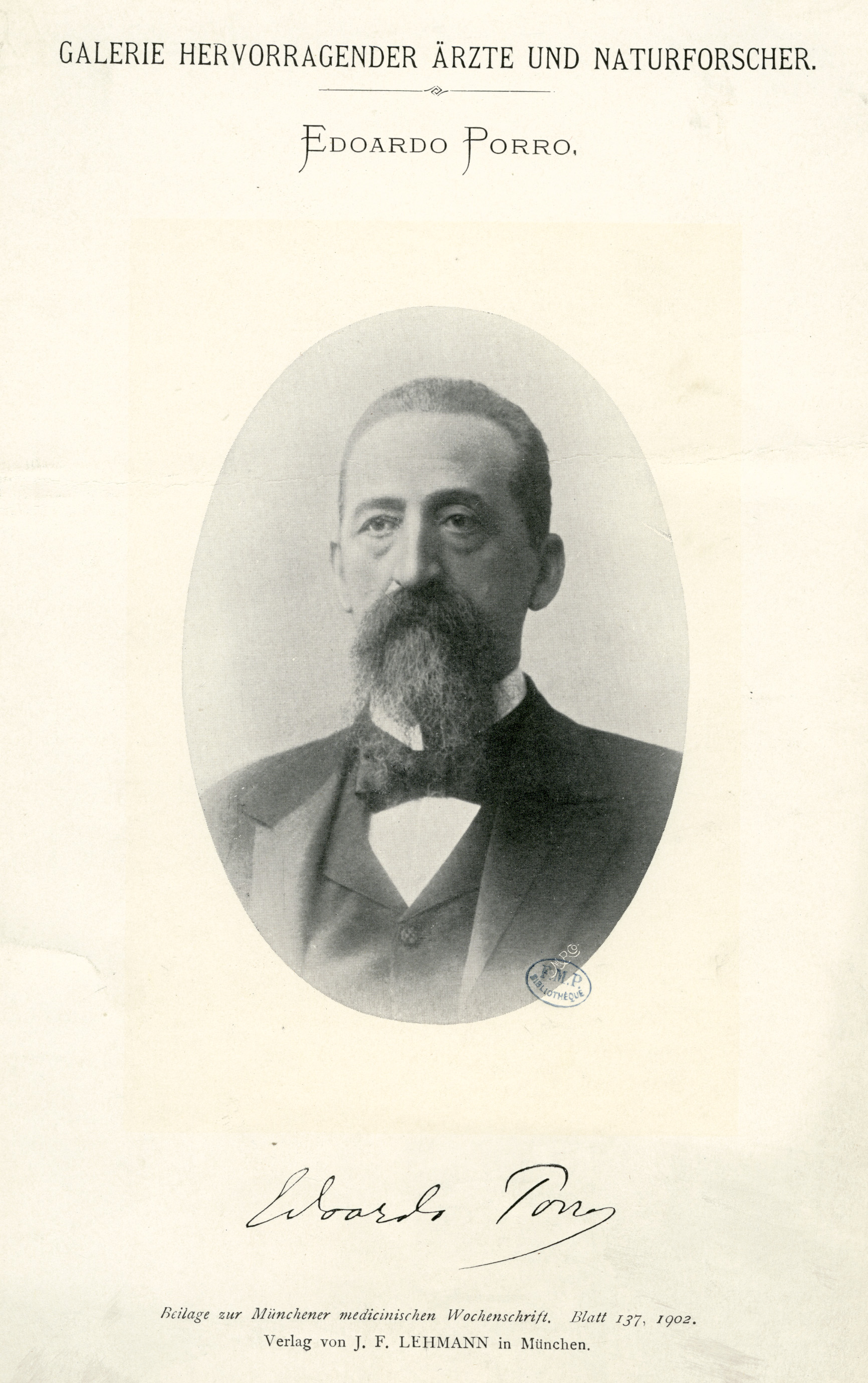
- Edoardo Porro
- Born: 13 September 1842; Padua, Austrian Empire
- Died: 18 July 1902 (aged 59); Milan, Italy
- Known for: Developer of Porro’s operation
- Scientific career
- Fields: Medicine, gynaecology, obstetrics

Edoardo Porro (1842–1902) was an Italian obstetrician and gynaecologist, mainly known for developing Porro’s operation, surgical procedure precursor of the modern Caesarean section.

== Biography ==
=== Early life ===
Edoardo Porro was born in Padua on September 13, 1842 from Anna Maria Cassola and his father Giovanni who had been transferred there as a Land Registry engineer, and he died in Milan on July 18, 1902.

He was raised in Milan where he went to “Ginnasio Liceale dell' Arcidiocesi” and he enrolled in 1860 in medical school at the University of Pavia, where medical luminaries were teaching.

Porro went through his university years without being a student of any particular merit; in fact he barely passed the exam of Human Anatomy, which constitutes the basic foundation of a surgeon, scoring only eighteen over thirty. He obtained his M. D. in August 1865 at the University of Pavia, at the age of twenty-three.

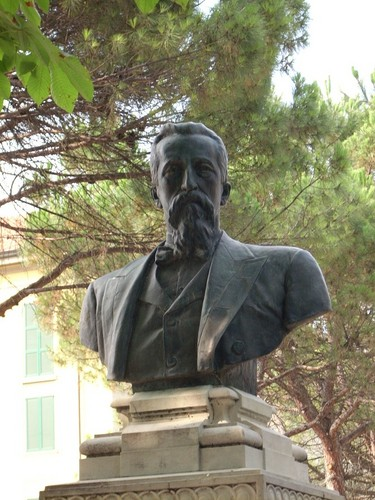
Edoardo Porro's monument in Salsomaggiore (Parma, Italy)

=== Military service ===
After his graduation and after a brief internship at the Ospedale Maggiore in Milan, instead of devoting himself to the pursuit of his profession, he volunteered as a soldier and doctor under Giuseppe Garibaldi, and followed the revolutionary leader in the cause of Italian unity in the campaign of 1866 in the Tyrol. Even though he was a fervent catholic, he was present the following year at the surrender of Mentana. This delusional event closed his patriotic activity.

=== Medical Career ===
In December 1868 he was appointed to the position of surgeon assistant in the department of obstetrics at the “Ospedale Maggiore” in Milan. There for over seven years he devoted himself to the study and practice of obstetrics and gynaecology as an instructor and a clinician.

He was influenced by his personal and professional relationship in the battlefield with Malachia De Cristoforis, who translated Charles West’s “Lectures on the disease of women” after meeting him in London.

Among the most powerful influences on his mind in favour of the Caesarean section, was his systematic investigation into the results of induction of premature labour during his residence in Milan. In 1871 he published “Risultati apparenti e risultati veri del parto prematuro artificiale”.

In March 1871, after the intendant’s death, Porro temporarily took on the directorship of the Ospizio di Maternità and of the Regia Scuola Ostetrica of Milan.

=== Illness ===
On june 28, 1871 he performed an internal podalic version on a woman affected by syphilis with bare hands (as surgical gloves will only be introduced by the American surgeon William Stewart Halsted in 1889); during this operation he cut his hand and got infected with the disease.

His health slowly declined, manifesting recurrent infections like exanthema and inflammations, neuralgia, nephritis which eventually lead him to death.

For years he lived with syphilis trying all known treatments, while still maintaining his directorship until the end of 1872.

Even though he was tormented by his illness he started a fervent research activity for the Opera Pia di Santa Corona in Milan, putting in a theoretical framework his previous observations on Caesarean section.

On November 24, 1875 he even obtained the appointment of Professor of Obstetrics in the University of Pavia, 'not by the protection of the great or by caprice of fortune, but by the force of true and real merit.'

=== The revolution ===
In the years from 1873 to 1875 he was absorbed by an intense clinical activity, accompanied by many scientific publications, manifesting his interest in matters of conscience. In fact, going against his colleagues, he stood in favor of therapeutic abortions in the most difficult childbirth cases because the only treatment would have been the caesarean cut, resulting in the mother’s death.

These experiences lead him to realise the epoch-making operation, with which we associate the name of Porro, first performed on May 21, 1876. It consists in an excision of the uterus and adnexae, described in ‘Della amputazione utero-ovarica come complemento di taglio cesareo’ (1876), the best known of his writings. The operation was far removed from being a mere stroke of happy chance, or the fortuitous result of operative proceedings commenced under a misapprehension or mistaken diagnosis, as has been so often the case in the initial stages of advances in gynaecology.

Porro was not, however, the first to remove the gravid uterus in a living woman. This had already been done in America by Dr. Horatio Storer of Boston, in 1869, but his operation was one of necessity rather than one of election.

Porro encountered some resistance from colleagues who raised ethical questions: causing the sterility of the women undergoing this operation was considered immoral. The physician, a passionate catholic, decided to seek advice from the Bishop of Pavia, who reassured him and recognized him the right to “sacrifice a part for the sake of the whole”.

It is interesting to note that this case was maybe the first, in the history of medicine, in which progress raises a new moral concern.

The work of Porro attracted the attention of the medical profession in Europe to the achievements of Italian physicians and surgeons to an extent unknown since the schools of Padua and Bologna began to decline.

Porro’s operation was enthusiastically taken up in both Europe and the USA. Within five years of his initial operation, 50 cases delivered with this method showed a maternal mortality of 58% and infant survival of 86%, a major advance for the time.

It would be appropriate to call attention to the following astounding facts: in the Vienna Hospital, from 1784 to 1884, there had not been a recovery after a Cæsarean section, and in Italy the same operation was almost always fatal. On the other hand, nearly half of Porro's operations have been successful, notwithstanding that the operation has been performed by as many as thirty-five different surgeons.

In the February 1891 issue of The Indian medical gazette, a civil surgeon entitled his article “Case of Porro’s operation” in which he described in detail all the steps of him performing Porro’s operation on a young woman with a really small pelvis to deliver her baby, unfortunately dead because she had been in labour for 5 days, while managing to save her.

Porro’s technique has not disappeared from today’s obstetrics. It has been improved and is, sometimes, still used in emergency situations and difficult cases, when the removal of the uterus is the only way to stop the haemorrhage.

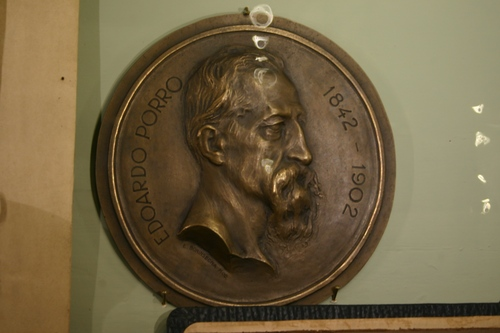
Porro’s Bronze medal, in the University History Museum in Pavia

On november 20, 1891 he was also named Senator of the Italian Republic.

In 1901 he was awarded a bronze medal by the Italian government to commemorate the 25th anniversary of his first successful operation.

He died on 18 July 1902, at the age of 59, due to his syphilitic nephritis, in Milan.

== Porro’s Operation ==
Until the 1700s the Caesarean section was only practiced on dead women, since the attempt of performing it on a living woman, was invariably followed by her death, as a consequence of the hemorrhagic or septic complications, which characterized the post-operatory course.

It was only after the 1700 that the operation started losing its religious character and becoming purely obstetric: attempts of operation on living women started, with the aim of saving both the mother and the child, when natural childbirth was impossible. Until the latter part of the 19th century, the mortality was still virtually 100%.

In the history of the caesarean section, the work of the Italian obstetrician Edoardo Porro represents a pivotal stage in the development of the procedure in the modern era. It was a surgical, obstetric, but also human revolution.

Porro performed a hysterectomy during a caesarean operation in order to control haemorrhage and prevent peritonitis. Porro’s procedure contemplated the amputation of both the uterus and the ovaries after the Caesarean cut had been performed. The infection of these organs was, in Êfact, as Porro had correctly hypothesised, the cause of death in nearly all cases.

=== Experiments ===
He started experimenting with the Caesarean section on 3 rabbits, as he was inspired to experiment on animals, before attempting the amputation on women, from the great experimenter Eusebio Oehl. The animals he operated, were able to recover, but the little bunnies did not survive because in order to avoid a spontaneous birth, the operation was performed too early on.

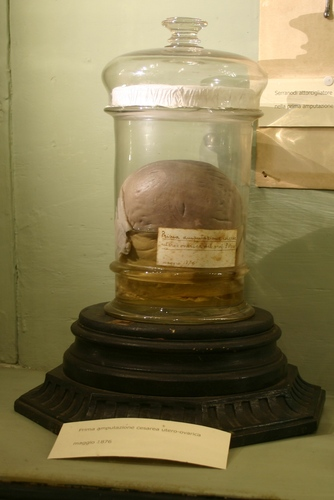
Uterus removed from Giulia Cavallini

Thanks to these experiments the physician obtained proof that the removal of the uterus could have been a plausible therapeutic option. During the years 1874-75, Porro made many experiments in the removal of the uterus in pregnant rabbits, and took such opportunities as came in his way of operating on the cadaver, with the object of preparing himself for the operation which he ultimately performed on the living patient.

=== The first case: Giulia Cavallini ===
The first case, operated on May 21, 1876, was a 25-year-old primigravid, Giulia Cavallini, who was referred to Porro’s clinic in Pavia because of a suspected malformed pelvis from childhood rickets. The operation was performed under chloroform, in a teaching room (because of an outbreak of puerperal fever in the clinic).

Both mother and child survived, thus establishing a claim for the serious consideration of this operation as a substitute for the ordinary Cæsarean section, leading to an improved outcome for both, at the cost of the mother’s future fertility.

He published the case to the world a few months later in “Della amputazione utero-ovarico come complemento di taglio cesareo”(Milan, 1876), where he describes the operation with analytic precision.

== Terms ==
- Porro's operation - cesarean section, followed by removal of the uterus, together with its appendages, including the ovaries, leaving only the cervical portion of the uterus.
- Porro-Müller operation - cesarean section in which the uterus is lifted from the abdominal cavity before the fetus is extracted
- Porro-Veit operation - cesarean section by Porro's method, in which the stump is ligated and returned to its place

== Bibliography ==
- Anonymous Author (1902) “Edoardo Porro”. BJOG: An International Journal of Obstetrics and Gynaecology 2 (4): 405–7.
- Cani, Valentina (2016). “”Edoardo Porro”- Dizionario biografico degli italiani” vol.85, Treccani.
- Dotti, Marco (2015). L'evento che rivoluzionò il parto cesareo.
- Godson, Clement (1884).The British medical journal - British Medical Association, fifty-first annual meeting
- Lewis, B. E. 1928. “A Case of Porro’s Hysterectomy.” The Indian Medical Gazette 63 (3): 127–28.
- Maclaren, G. G. 1891. “Case of Porro’s Operation.” The Indian Medical Gazette 26 (2): 43–44.
- Mazzarello Paolo. 2015, E si salvò anche la madre. L'evento che rivoluzionò il parto cesareo, Bollati Boringhieri.
- Porro, Edoardo (1876). “Della amputazione utero-ovarica”. In Milano: Rechiedei (ed).
- Todman, Don. 2008. “Eduardo Porro (1842-1902): Bronze Medal Struck in 1901 to Commemorate the 25th Anniversary of His Successfully Performed Caesarean-Hysterectomy in 1876.” Journal of Medical Biography 16 (3).
