= Museum of Archeology of the University of Pavia =

- Museo di Archeologia dell'Università degli Studi di Pavia
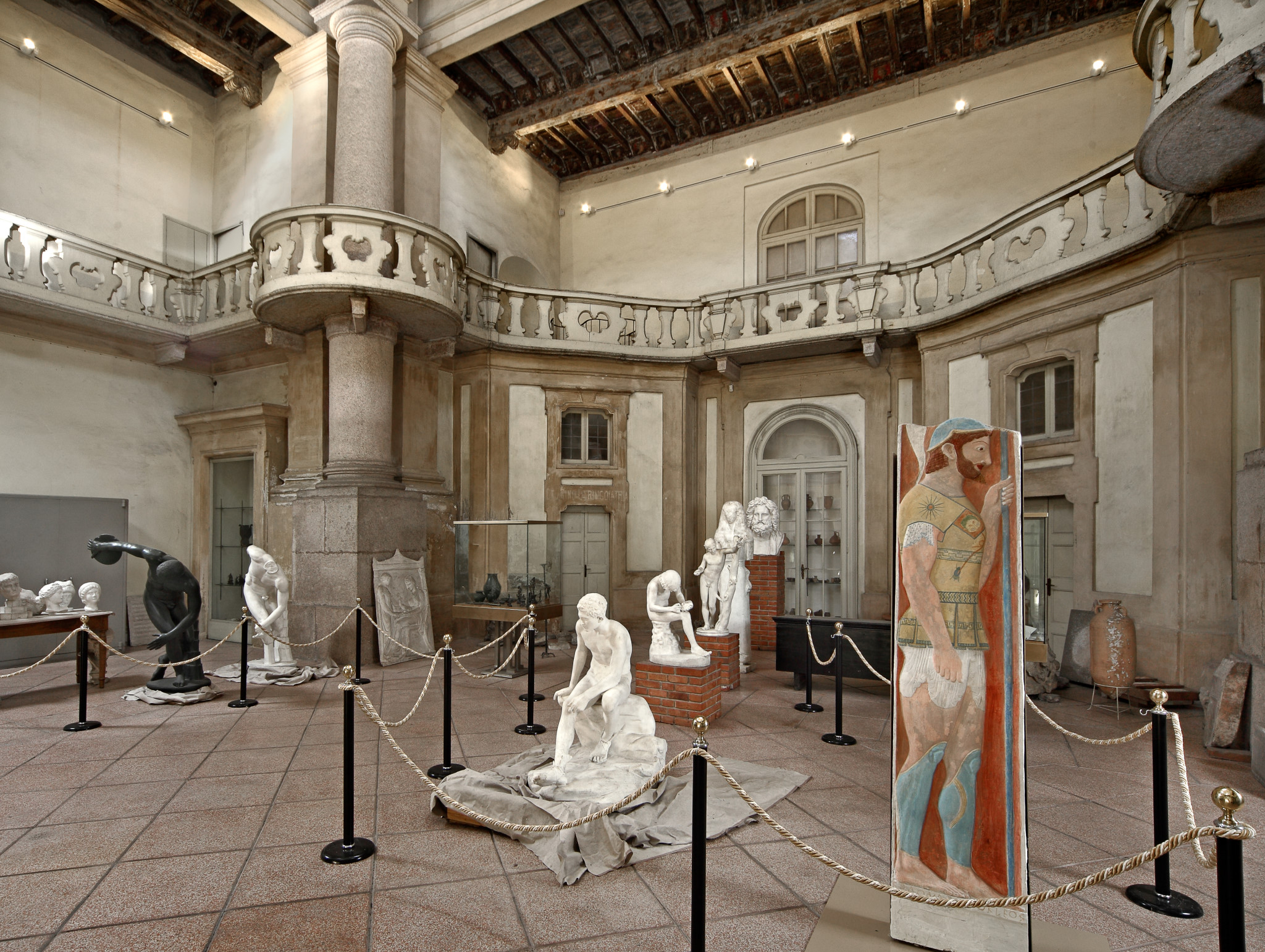
- Palazzo Centrale which hosts the Museum of Archeology
- Established: 1819
- Location: Palazzo Centrale, Via Strada Nuova 65, Pavia, Italy
- Coordinates: 45.1870°N 9.1572°E
- Type: Archeological museum
- Owner: University of Pavia
- Public transit access: Pavia railway station
- Website: archeologia.unipv.eu/homepageeng

The Museum of Archeology of the University of Pavia was established in 1819 and is, together with that of Padua, one of the oldest in Italy. The museum is located inside the ancient San Matteo hospital in Pavia.

== History ==
In 1818 Pier Vittorio Aldini participated in the competition for the first chair of Archeology at the University of Pavia, the oldest in Italy, won the post the following year he took up service. The Museum of Archeology of the University of Pavia was born with the name of "Numismatic and antiquarian cabinet" on the initiative of Pier Vittorio Aldini, as an integral part of the Institute of Archeology founded in 1819, one of the oldest, together with that of Padua, in Italy. The predominantly didactic purpose of the collection, initially fueled by a prudent purchasing policy and conceived as a field of practical exercises in archeology and classical art history, gives the reason for its non-specialist character, but articulated on a great variety of materials, distributed over a very extended chronological span (from the 2nd millennium BC to late antiquity).

The series of marble sculptures largely dates back to Aldini's acquisitions, including the most valuable piece in the collection, the splendid female head, a Roman replica of the Aphrodite Sosadra of Calamis. Also in the same collection a group of Roman marble statues from Velleia was enriched. Of remarkable quality is a private female portrait of the imperial age assigned to the second half of the 2nd century AD. Interesting for the history of the circulation of forgeries in the antiquarian trade is the presence of some pieces of modern execution, including an eighteenth-century copy of a portrait in the National Museum of Naples, long considered to be a Hellenistic original.

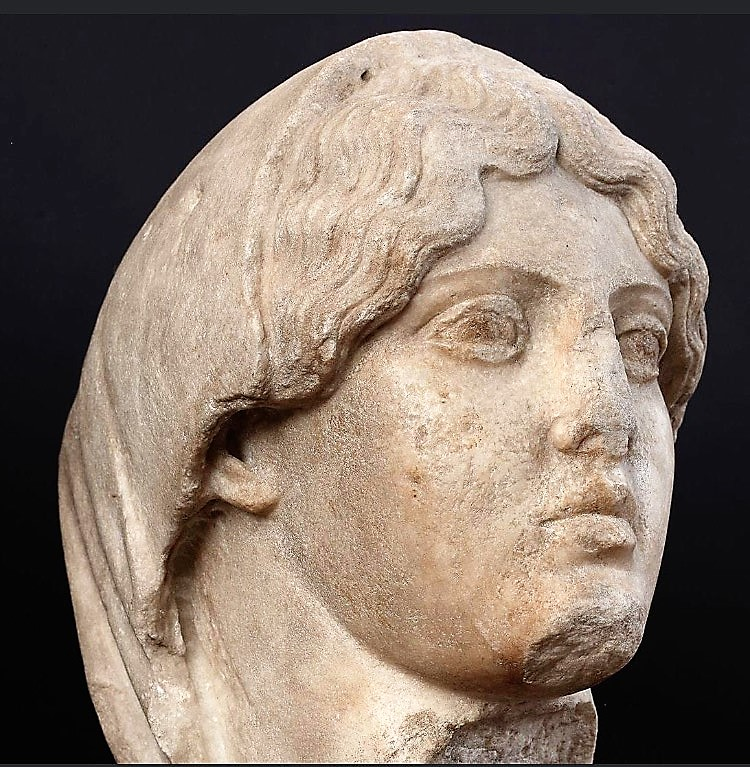
Aphrodite Sosandra of Calamis

The original nucleus of the collection also includes architectural elements, epigraphs (including two inscriptions on bronze lamina with medical prescriptions found at Vernavola) and objects belonging to different classes of artefacts (ceramics, glass, metal objects, gems and rings), acquired, also locally, with the aim of offering students an effective sampling of the material culture of antiquity, understood in the modern way as a source for ancient history. The small bronzes are represented by a series of statuettes of divinities from different cultural areas (Egypt, Magna Graecia, Etruria, the Roman world): alongside types derived from the great statuary of classical Greece, typically Roman figures are represented, such as the statuettes of Lares, expression of the domestic cult. From the purchase in 1831 of the collection of the Milanese sculptor Giovanni Battista Comolli come a series of painted vases of Apulian production (4th century BC) and a small group of black-glazed Ware pottery attributable to Etruscan and southern Italic factories. In 1845 there was already a small collection of Egyptian and oriental material.

Among Aldini's merits we should mention the acquisition of one of the major numismatics formed in Pavia between the 17th and 18th centuries, that of the Bellisomi marquises, exponents of the Pavia aristocracy open to antiquarian and Enlightenment culture. A significant increase in the materials of the university museum occurred later, in the 1930s, with the acquisition of a series of Etruscan figurative terracottas, donated by Pope Pius XI. In 1933 the museum received from the Superintendency of Antiquities of Naples a set of bronze pottery and a small group of architectural terracottas from Pompeii. In 1940 Carlo Albizzati bought for the Museum, with other materials, two interesting examples of pottery from the end of the 4th century BC: an overpainted Volterra crater and a red-figured hydra from Campania. One of the most recent donations, in the 1970s (a group of ceramic specimens from Arezzo), is due to Arturo Stenico. An important fifteenth-century marble statue depicting a holy bishop (perhaps St. Augustine), formerly located in the Leano courtyard of the University, is currently conserved in the space of the museum.

== Description ==
The museum is divided into several collections:

=== The collections of coins and engraved gems ===
The numismatic heritage has about 8,000 pieces divided between Greek, Roman republican and imperial, Celtic, late antique and Byzantine coins. The collection of carvings (scarabs, gems, engraved glass paste and cameos) and digital rings includes a total of 66 specimens of unknown provenance. However, a first nucleus was acquired by the founder of the Museum, Pier Vittorio Aldini, while others arrived through donations, we remember in particular that of the rector Arcangelo Spedalieri (1779-1823) who wanted to leave his small (29 gold coins, 300 silver and only 76 bronze) but rich collection of Greek, Roman, Byzantine, medieval and modern coins, almost all of Sicilian origin. The eighteenth-century numismatic collecting in Pavia is well represented by the collection of coins formed throughout the eighteenth century by three generations of representatives of the Bellisomi family and finally donated to the University in 1821, it consists mainly of Roman coins, both republican and imperial. Again through donations, the collection of Marquis Stefano Bernardo Majnoni, a native of Intignano and probably the most active and cultured collector of the first half of the nineteenth century in Lombardy, also enriched the museum's assets. In particular, Majnoni studied and collected Kufic, Sassanid coins and coins from the Greek mints of the East and left to the university a nucleus of archaic coins from Sybaris, from the Greek cities of Asia and provincial Romans.

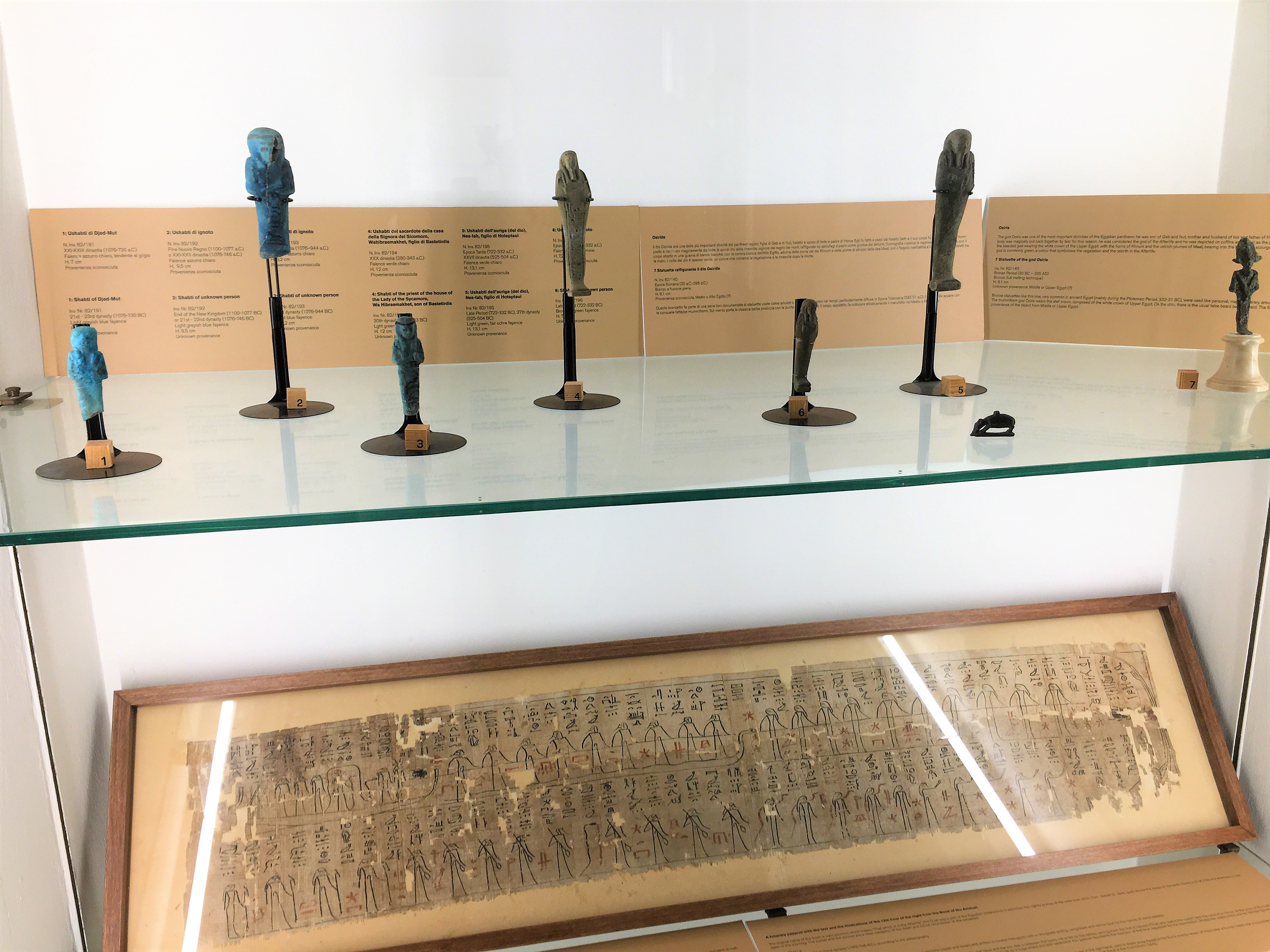
Egyptian archaeological finds

=== Collection of prehistoric artifacts ===
These are finds from various Lombard settlements: stone and bone tools, chipped and polished flints, scraper blades, arrowheads. The protohistoric pottery is of coarse dough and worked by hand. Also conserved are a spearhead and bronze fibulae, bracelets and rings, some decorated with globes. These finds represent the substratum of indigenous cultures of northern Italy, then subjected to the Romanization process.

=== Egyptian and Oriental Collection ===
The Egyptian collection, begun around 1845, is made up of two mummies (one intact female and one male of which only the head is possessed) and objects from funerary contexts: ushabti, a papyrus from Amduat, which recounts the nocturnal journey of the Sun and figures in painted wood recomposed under restoration in an inlaid mummy board, almost unique in the Italian Egyptological collections. Extraneous to the Egyptian world is the clay figurine, of Syrian origin, datable between 2000 and 1800 BC.

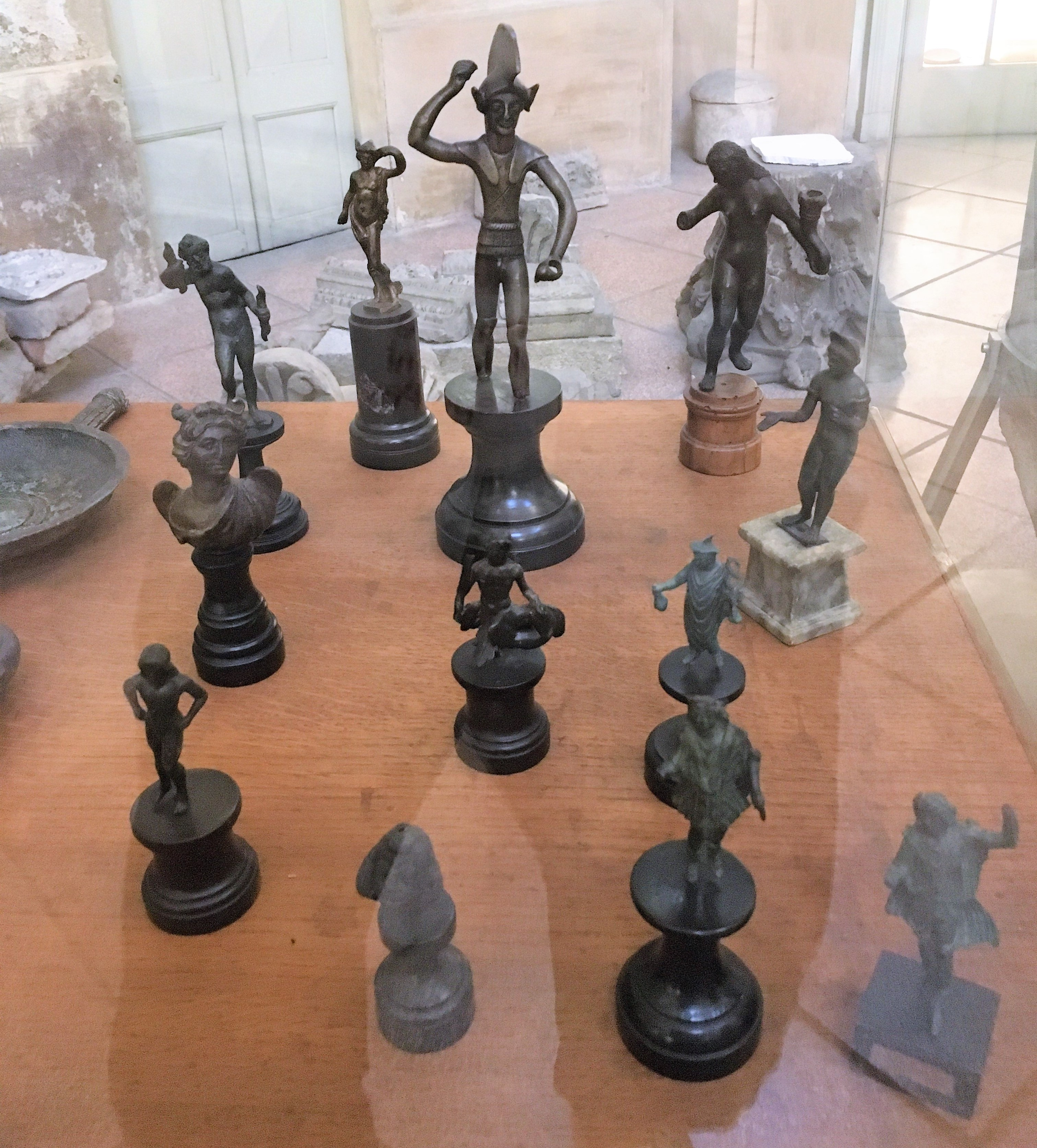
Bronze statuettes of Etruscan, Umbrian and Roman production

=== Southern Italian, Etruscan and Roman pottery collection ===
The collection consists of a group of Apulian vases, probably of funerary origin, which belonged to the Milanese sculptor Giovanni Battista Comolli and acquired in 1831 and two bell hydriai, which arrived between 1929 and 1948 thanks to Carlo Albizzati, professor of Archeology in the University of Pavia. But Etruscan-Italic black-glazed Ware and a large Volterra krater are also preserved, without forgetting the Roman production, as evidenced by table pottery, terra sigillata and amphorae.

=== Collection of Etruscan ex-voto clay ===
The civilization of peninsular Italy before the Roman conquest is witnessed in the Museum as well as by ceramics, by a precious Umbrian bronze statuette of a warrior (mid-5th century BC) and by the extraordinary series of votive terracottas, donated by Pope Pius XI in 1934 to the University of Pavia, in the form of heads and anatomical parts, dating back to the Hellenistic age, from Caere, today's Cerveteri. These finds, originally deposited in the Vatican Museums, reached Pavia thanks to the commitment of Carlo Albizzati.

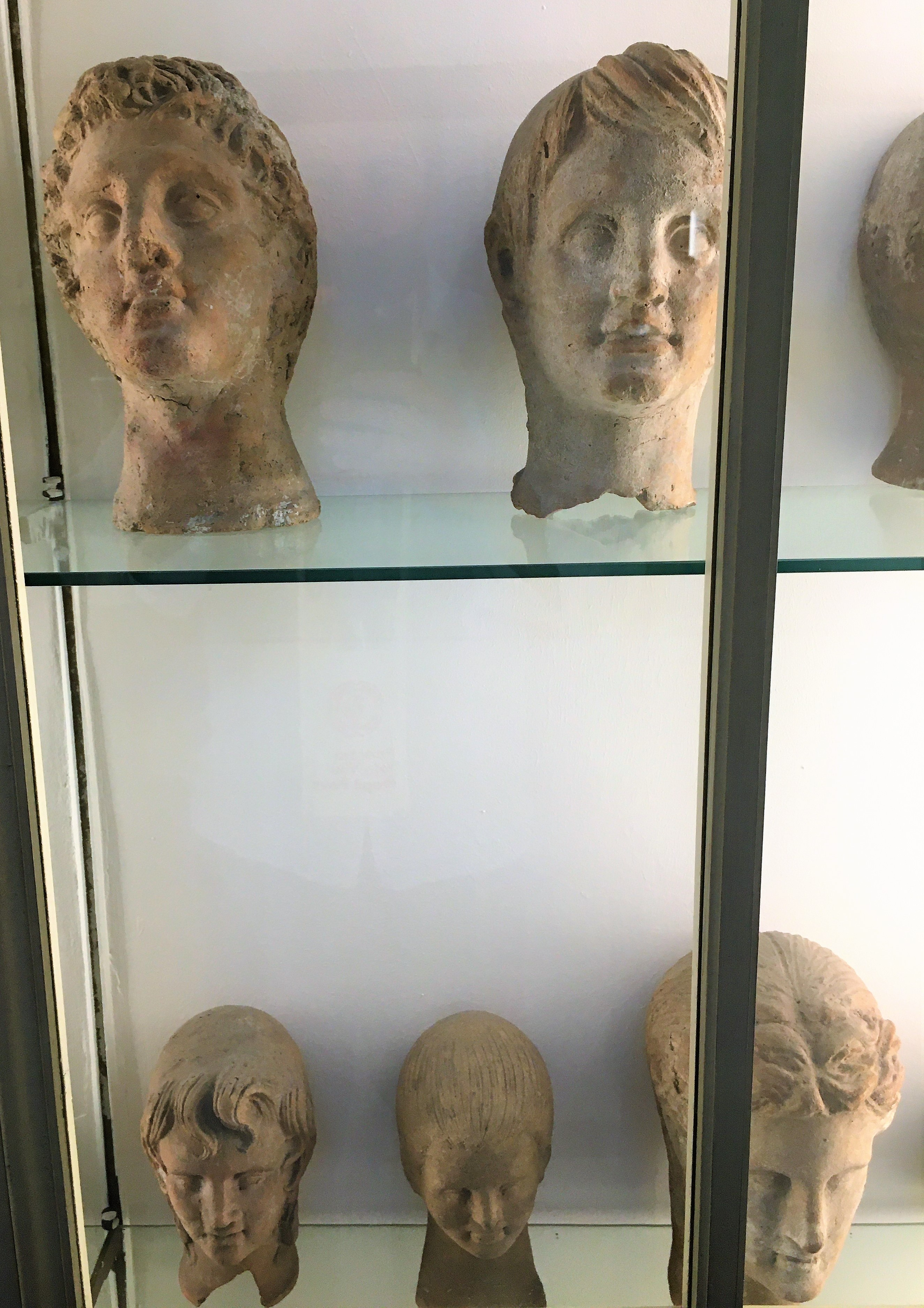
Etruscan ex-voto clay

=== Gypsotheque ===
Also belonging to the Archaeological Museum is the Gipsoteca (about thirty pieces) which preserves plaster casts on a 1:1 scale of famous works of classical sculpture, from the archaic age to Hellenism, such as the Discobolus, Apollo Sauroktònos, the Nike of Samothrace or the Aphrodite of Milo. The casts, recently restored, were purchased in the first half of the twentieth century in France and at the Milanese laboratory of Carlo Campi, who worked at the service of the Brera Academy.
