= Antonio Scarpa =

Italian anatomist and professor

Antonio Scarpa FRS
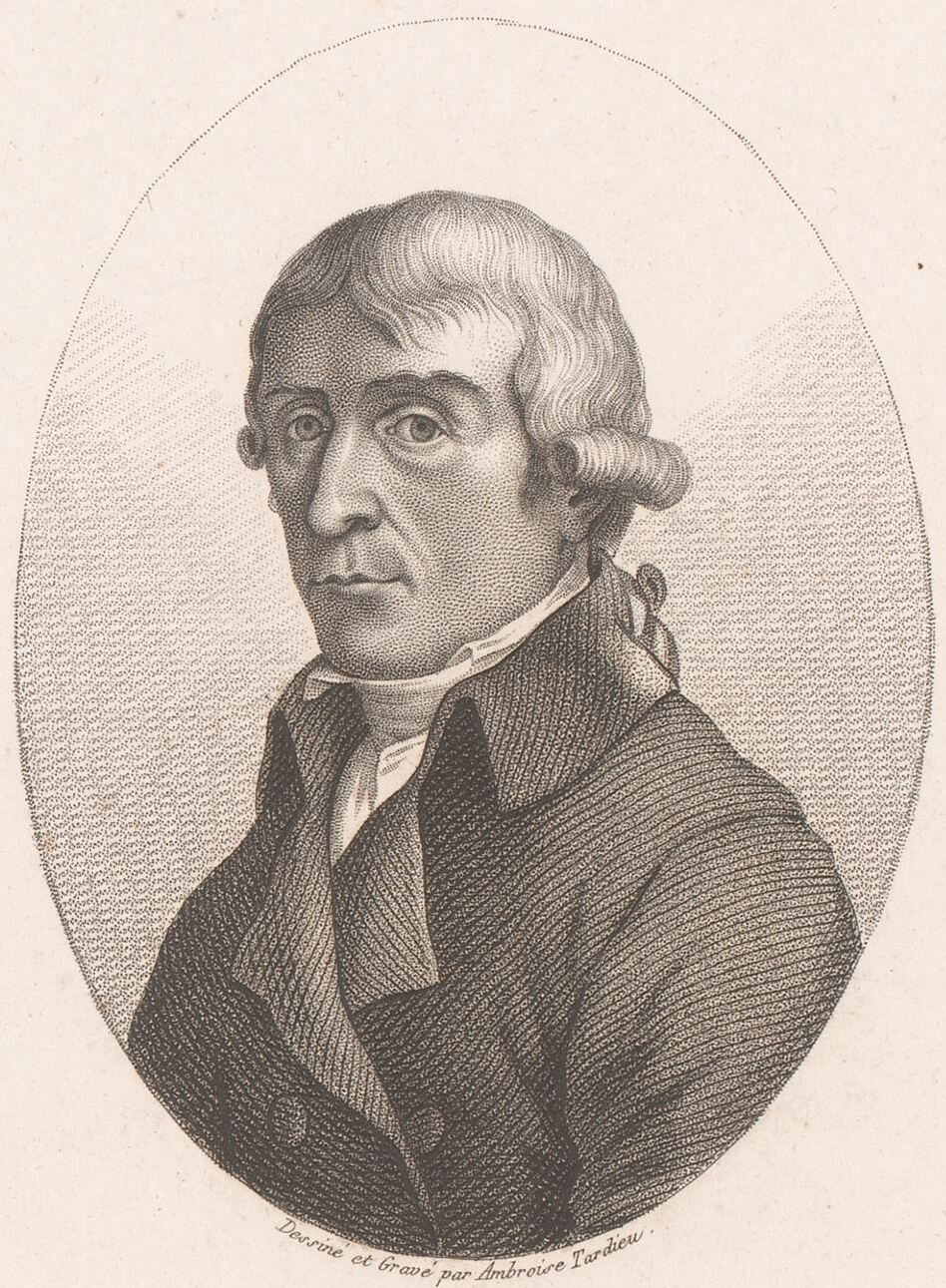
- Born: 9 May 1752; Motta di Livenza
- Died: 31 October 1832 (aged 80); Bosnasco
- Education: University of Padua
- Scientific career
- Fields: Anatomist
- Workplaces: University of Modena
- Academic advisors: Giovanni Battista Morgagni, Leopoldo Marco Antonio Caldani
- Notable students: Ignaz Döllinger

Antonio Scarpa FRS (9 May 1752 – 31 October 1832) was an Italian anatomist and professor.

== Biography ==
Scarpa was born to an impoverished family in the frazione of Lorenzaga, Motta di Livenza, Veneto. An uncle, who was a member of the priesthood, gave him instruction until the age of 15, when he passed the entrance examination for the University of Padua. He was a pupil of Giovanni Battista Morgagni and Leopoldo Marco Antonio Caldani. Under the former, he became doctor of medicine on 19 May 1770; in 1772, he became professor at the University of Modena.

For a time he chose to travel, visiting Holland, France and England. When he returned to Italy, he was made professor of anatomy at the University of Pavia in 1783, on the strong recommendation of Emperor Joseph II. His lectures were so popular with students that Emperor Joseph II commissioned Leopoldo Pollack to build a new anatomic theater, now called Aula Scarpa, inside the Old Campus of the University of Pavia. He remained in that post until 1804, when he stepped down to allow his student Santo Fattori to assume the chair.

In May 1791, he was elected a Fellow of the Royal Society on account of being the "Author of some ingenious observations on the Ganglions of the Nerves, on the structure of the organs of hearing and smell, and other subjects of anatomy and Physiology".

In 1805, Napoleon was made King of Italy. He chose to visit the University of Pavia, upon which he inquired as to the whereabouts of Dr. Scarpa. He was informed that the doctor had been dismissed because of his political opinions and his refusal to take oaths, whereupon Dr. Scarpa was restored to his position as chair. In 1821, he was elected a foreign member of the Royal Swedish Academy of Sciences.

During his lifetime he became a rich man, acquiring a collection of valuable paintings and living a wealthy lifestyle. He was a confirmed bachelor and fathered several sons out of wedlock (whom he favoured through nepotism). In his career, he earned a reputation for ruthlessness, destroying his enemies and taxing his favourites to their limits. Toward the end of his life, Antonio Scarpa suffered from a stone in his urinary system.

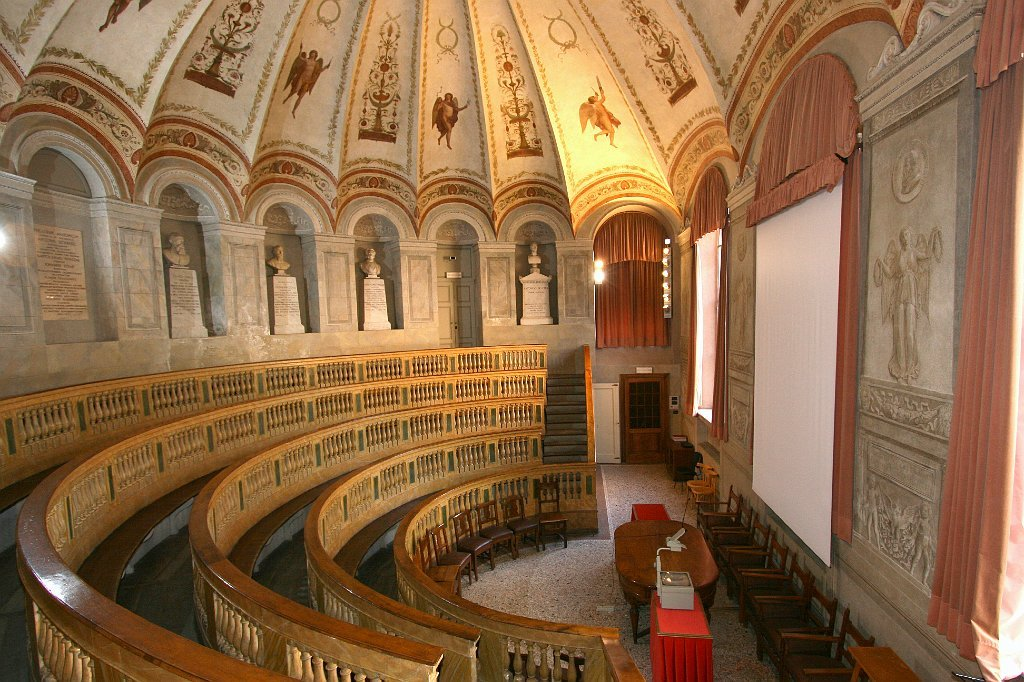
Leopoldo Pollack, Aula Scarpa, 1785, Old Campus of the University of Pavia.

This caused an inflammation of his bladder, which resulted in his death. He died in Pavia on 31 October 1832. After his death, his reputation was bitterly attacked, and even marble stones erected in his memory were defaced.

After his death, his assistant Carlo Beolchin performed an autopsy which was documented in a detailed report. The scientist's head was removed and displayed in the Institute of Anatomy. This was intended as a tribute to his work. The head is still exhibited at the University History Museum of the University of Pavia.

== Works ==
Dr. Scarpa published a number of medical treatises that were widely respected.

- De structura fenestrae rotundae auris et de tympano secundario, anatomicae observationes, his first published work, focused on the structure of the inner ear. It was printed in 1772, shortly after he joined the University of Modena.
- In 1789 he published Anatomicæ disquisitiones de auditu et olfactu, a study of the hearing and olfactory organs, which was soon considered a classical treatise on the subject.
- He published Tabulae neurologicae in 1794, which was the first work to give an accurate depiction of the heart's nerves and to show cardiac innervation. It is considered to be his finest work. Apparently, Dr. Scarpa locked the engraver in a room until the illustrations were finished. This work included his discovery that the inner ear was filled with fluid. (This was later named Scarpa's fluid, and subsequently endolymph.)
- Commentarius de Penitiori Ossium Structura, 1799, described the cellular structure of bone, along with notes on growth and diseases of bone.
- His 1801 work, Saggio di osservazioni e d'esperienze sulle principali malattie degli occhi (A Treatise on the Principal Diseases of the Eyes) described and illustrated the major eye diseases. It was the first ophthalmology text published in Italian, but was subsequently published in several languages and earned him the title of "father of Italian ophthalmology".
- Riflessioni ed Osservazione anatomico-chirugiche sull'Aneurisma, 1804, is a classical work on Aneurysms.
- Sull'ernie memorie anatomico-chirurgiche in 1809 was a treatise on the hernia. The supplement work, Sull'ernie del perineo the first ever discussion of the perineal hernia. Traité pratique des hernie, ou, Mémoires anatomiques et chirurgicaux sur ces maladies in 1812, was an authoritative work on hernia. Both Scarpa's fascia and Scarpa's triangle were derived from these works.

== Eponyms ==
- Scarpa's fascia
- Scarpa's fluid
- Scarpa's foramina
- Scarpa's ganglion
- Scarpa's hiatus
- Scarpa's membrane
- Scarpa's sheath
- Scarpa's shoe
- Scarpa's staphyloma
- Scarpa's triangle
