= Black-glazed Ware =

Ancient Greek fine pottery

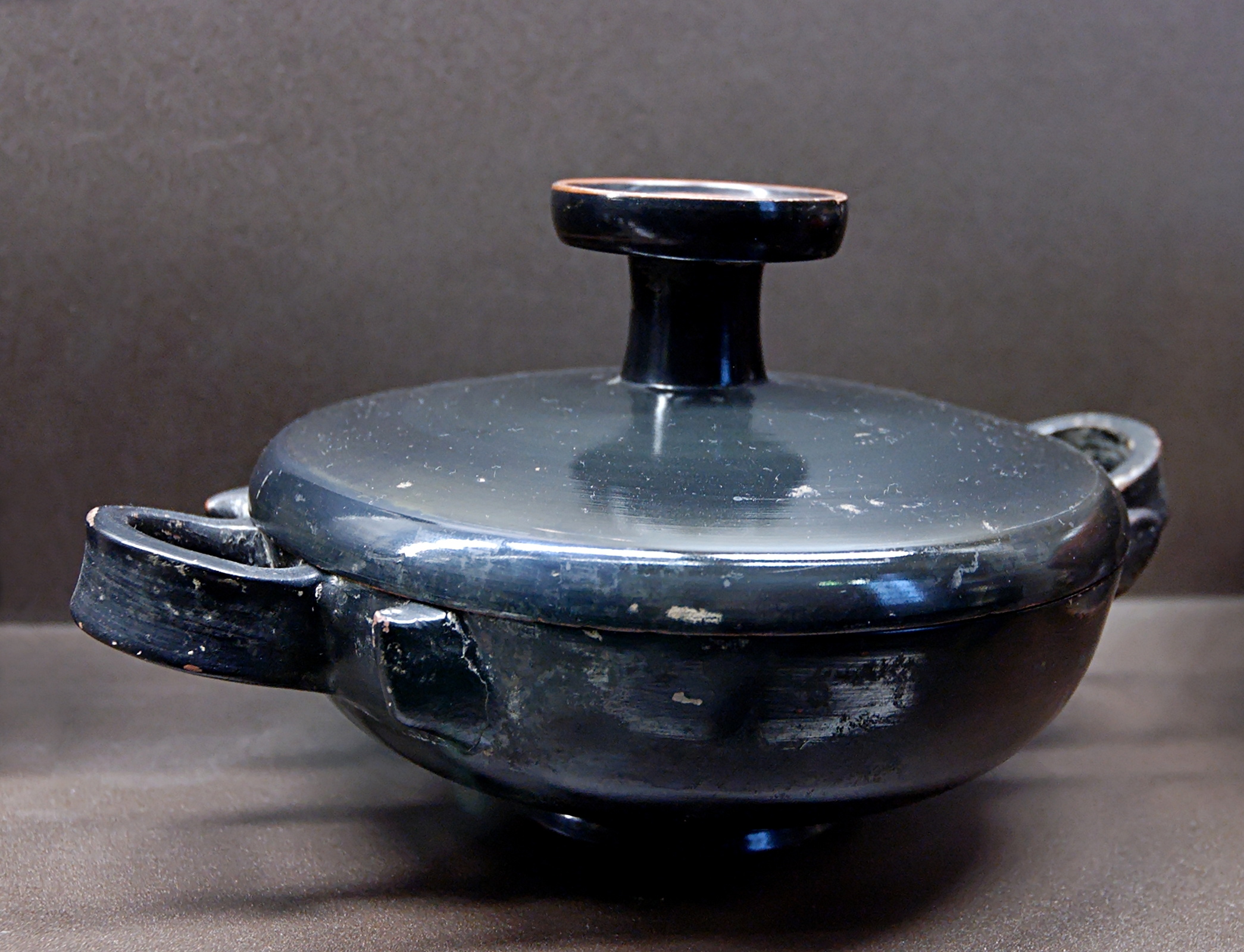
Attic black.glazed lekanis, circa 450/440 BC. Paris: Louvre.

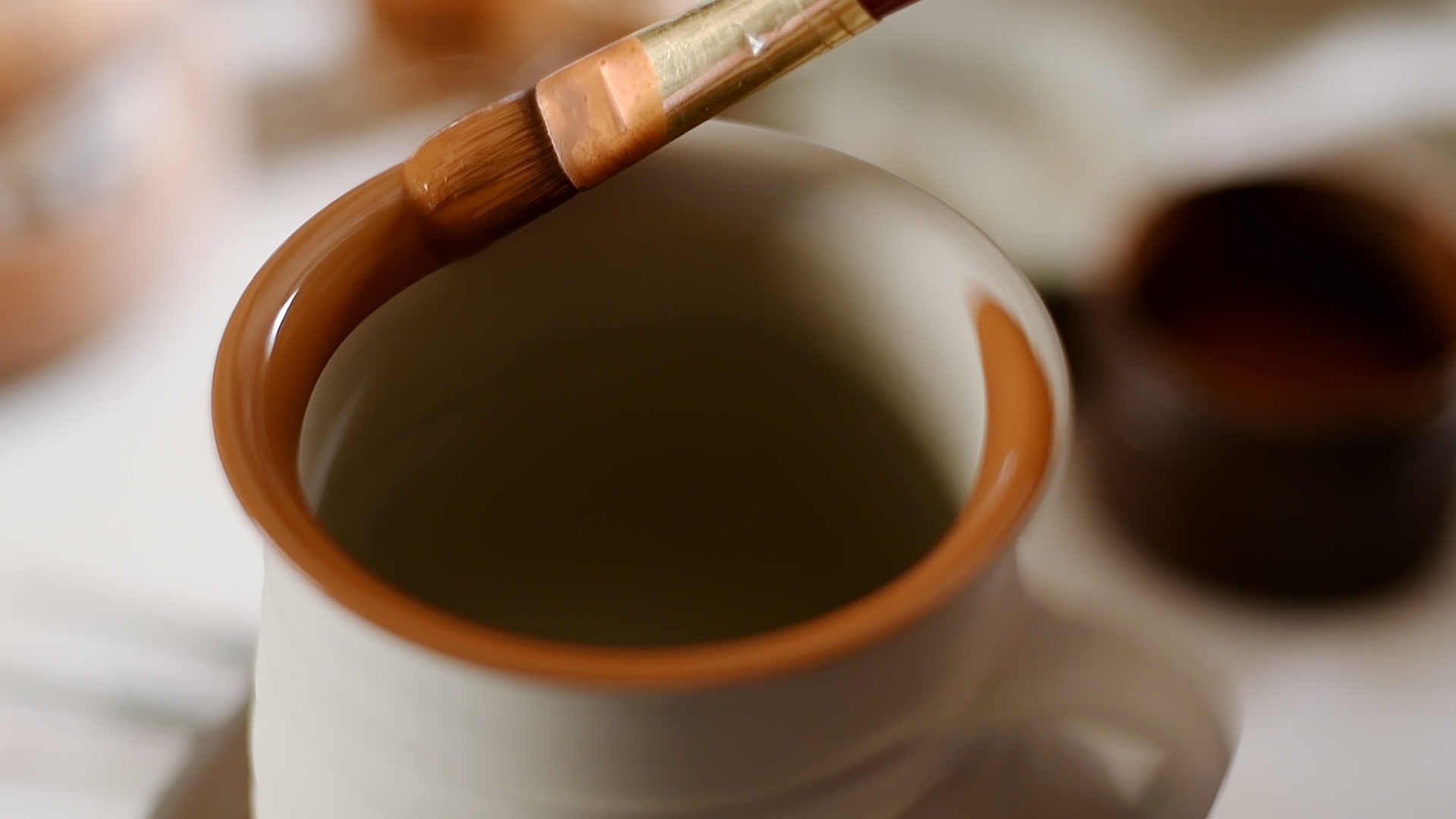
Application of an iron-rich clay slip (clay-paint) on the clay body of a skyphos, before firing. Contemporary black glaze pottery production at THETIS' workshop (Athens).

Black-glazed ware is a type of ancient Greek fine pottery. The modern term describes vessels covered with a shiny black slip.

Black-glazed pottery was produced especially in the Classical and Hellenistic periods. During the reducing phase of the three-phase firing sintering of the iron-rich "clay paint" led to a shiny black glaze. Such pottery was produced both on the potter's wheel or impressed in pre-shaped matrixes. The glaze, originally in the form of a fine grained clay paint, was added on with a paintbrush on the wheel, or by dipping. In some cases, black-glazed ware was additionally decorated with white, red or gold paint. Plastic decoration, either applied by stamp, or as applied reliefs, also occurred. Within about a hundred years, during the 5th century BC, black-glazed wares replaced the previously popular red-figure pottery from the Mediterranean markets. Since the Hellenistic periods, non-Greek workshops also produced it, usually just serving local or regional markets. In recent years, the importance of the type in modern research has increased considerably, especially in the contexts of culinary habits, regional contacts and trade links.

== Bibliography ==
- Roald F. Doctor: Schwarzfirniskeramik. In: Der Neue Pauly, vol. 11, cols. 281-282.
- The lost art of Attic black glaze ware . https://www.youtube.com/watch?v=4ILGcewvm0k
