= Old Campus of the University of Pavia =

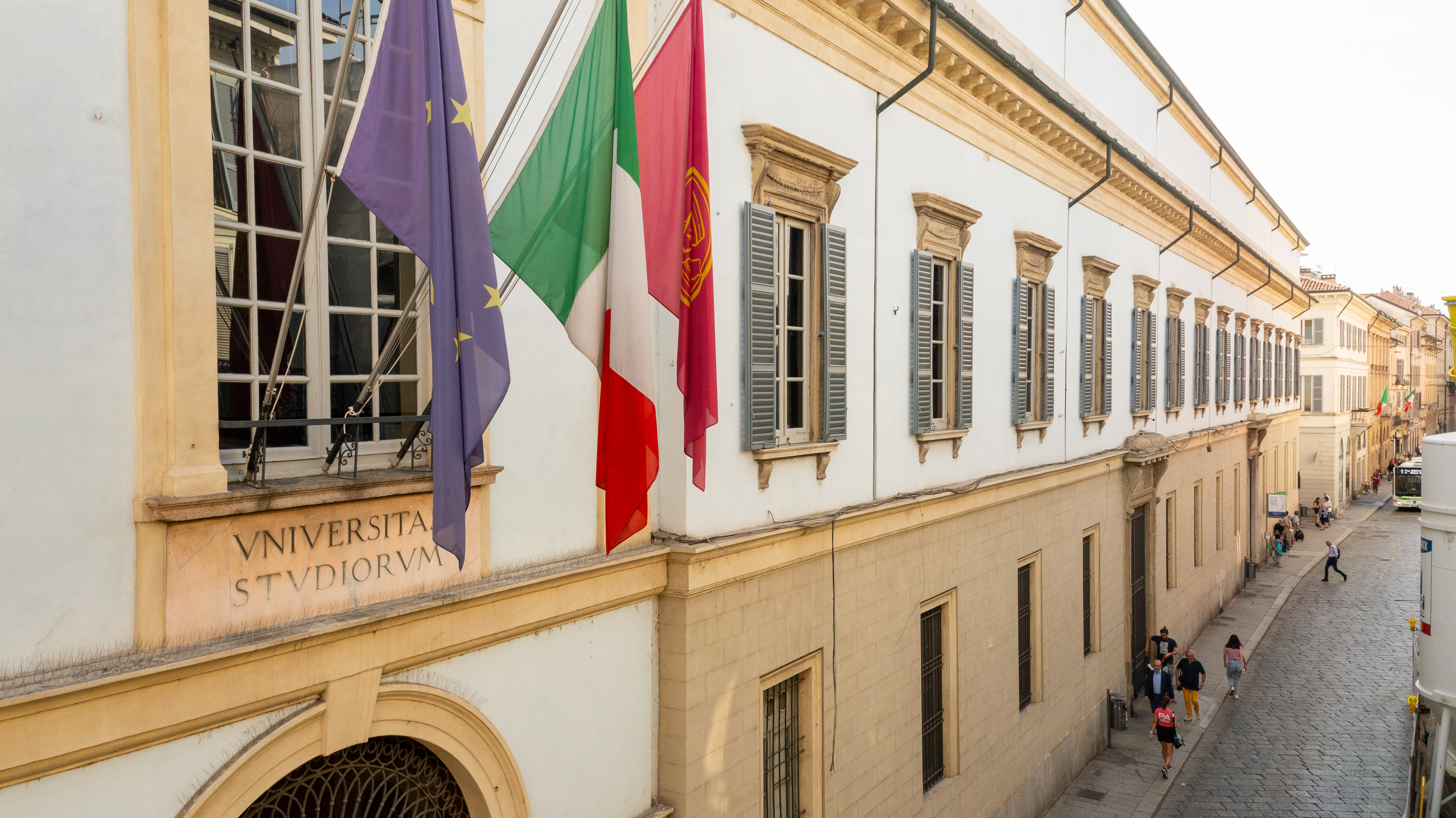
- Facade
- Interactive map of the Old Campus of the University of Pavia area

General information
- Type: Palace
- Location: Pavia, Italy
- Coordinates: 45°11′12″N 9°9′21″E
- Opened: 16th century
- Owner: University of Pavia

The Old Campus of the University of Pavia is a complex located in Pavia, in Lombardy, home to the rectorate and some university faculties and the University History Museum of the University of Pavia.

== History and architecture ==
The University of Pavia was founded in 1360, but for a long time the lessons took place in different places, such as in the rooms of the Dominican monastery of San Tommaso, in private homes or in the broletto, only between 1485 and 1490 Ludovico il Moro decided to donate to the university, the only one of the duchy of Milan and in great growth in those years, the palace of Azzone Visconti which was located along Strada Nuova, near the San Matteo hospital. The building was renovated in 1534 and during these works two courtyards with arcades and loggias were created, one intended for students of civil and canon law called "Legal" and the second, originally called "Doctor" along which the classrooms overlooked which housed the teachings of medicine, philosophy and liberal arts.

The two courtyards were modified between 1661 and 1671, based on a project by Giovanni Ambrogio Pessina, who also worked on the Fabbrica del Duomo of Milan.

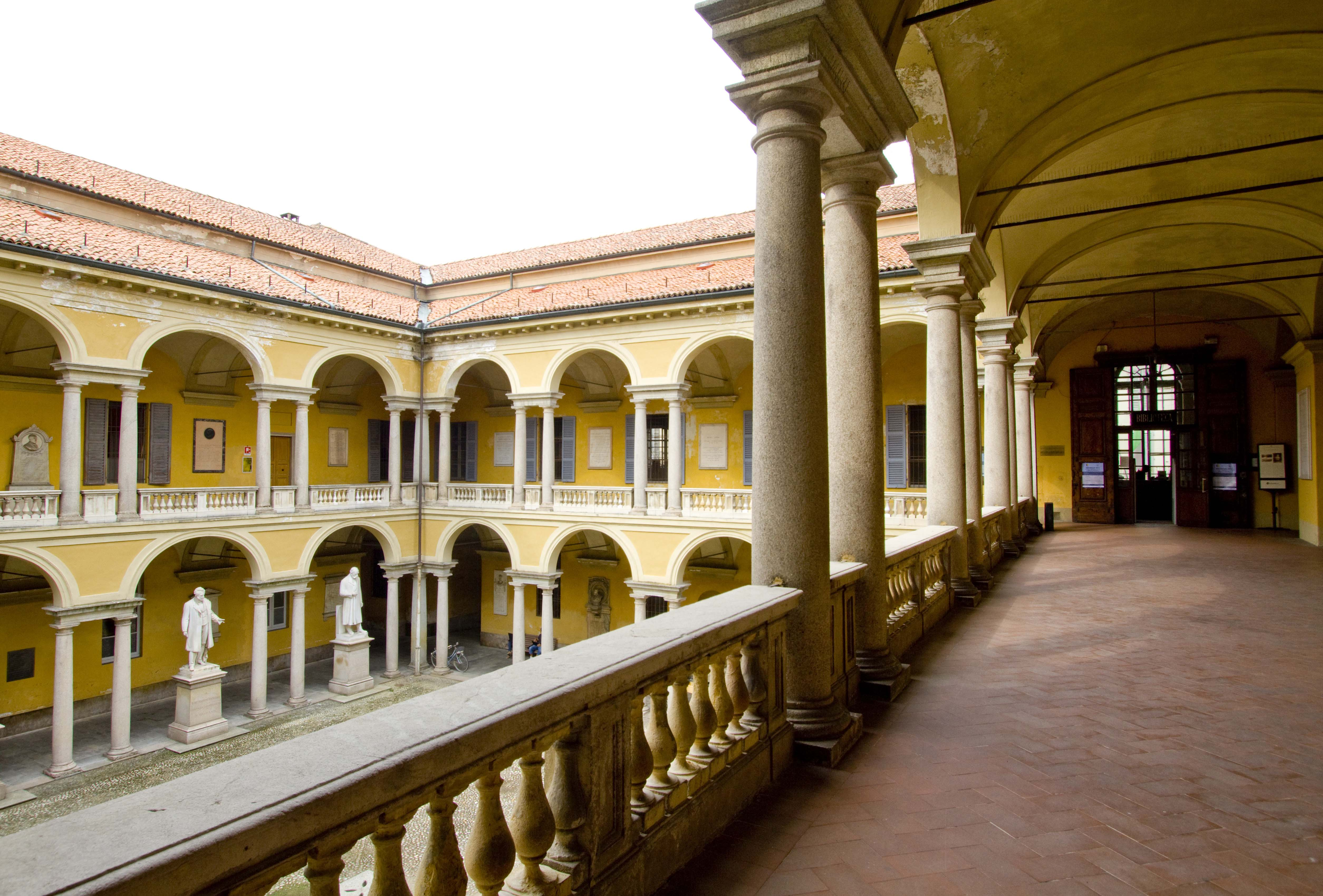
One of the courtyards at the historic campus. "Cortile delle statue"

Pessina designed the courtyards on a double portico, supported by paired Doric columns in pink Baveno granite, joined by balustrades on the upper floor and connected by polygonal arches. In the eighteenth century, Empress Maria Theresa revitalized the university, renewing its teachings, calling in teachers of European fame, but also having the complex completely renovated. The project was entrusted to Giuseppe Piermarini, who designed, between 1771 and 1773, the sober facade along Strada Nuova, enriched by two portals and modified the courtyards, replacing the coffered roofs with vaults and transforming the polygonal arches into round ones. The library (1772) and the Foscoliana hall (1775–1782) for graduation ceremonies were also completed. The growth that the university underwent in those years made new building interventions necessary, in 1783 the emperor Joseph II granted the university the complex of the monastery of Leano, recently suppressed and bordering the “Legal” courtyard. The new body, designed by Leopoldo Pollack and structured on a third courtyard, also equipped with a double loggia on coupled Doric columns, completed in 1785, was destined for the faculty of Theology. Also in the same areas, thanks to the funding granted by the emperor, the new anatomical theater (aula Scarpa) between 1785 and 1786 and the physical theater, today aula Volta, were created in 1787, again on a project by Leopoldo Pollack.

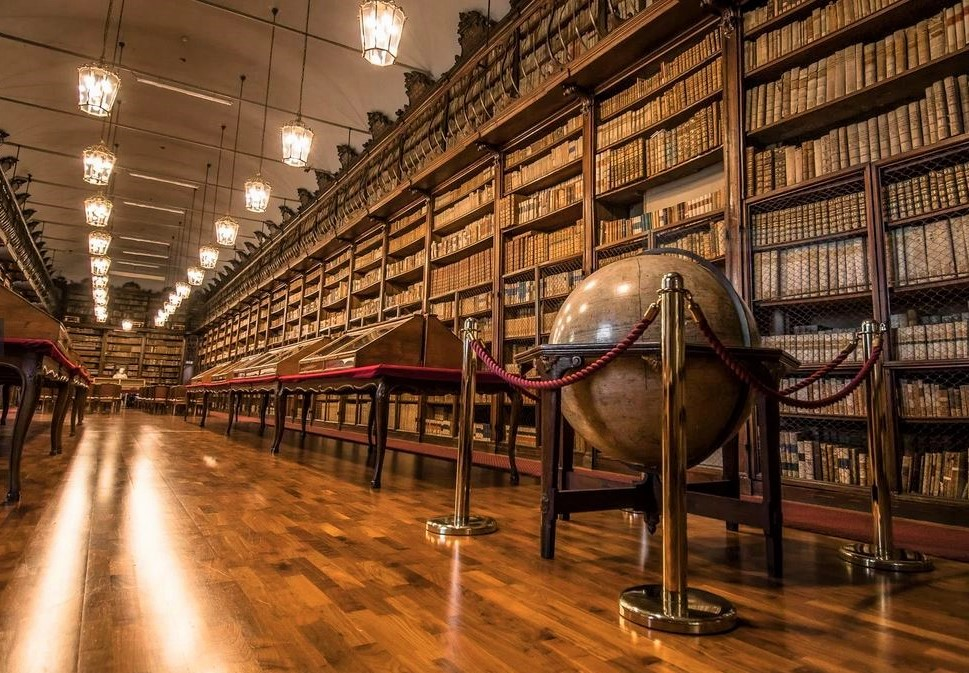
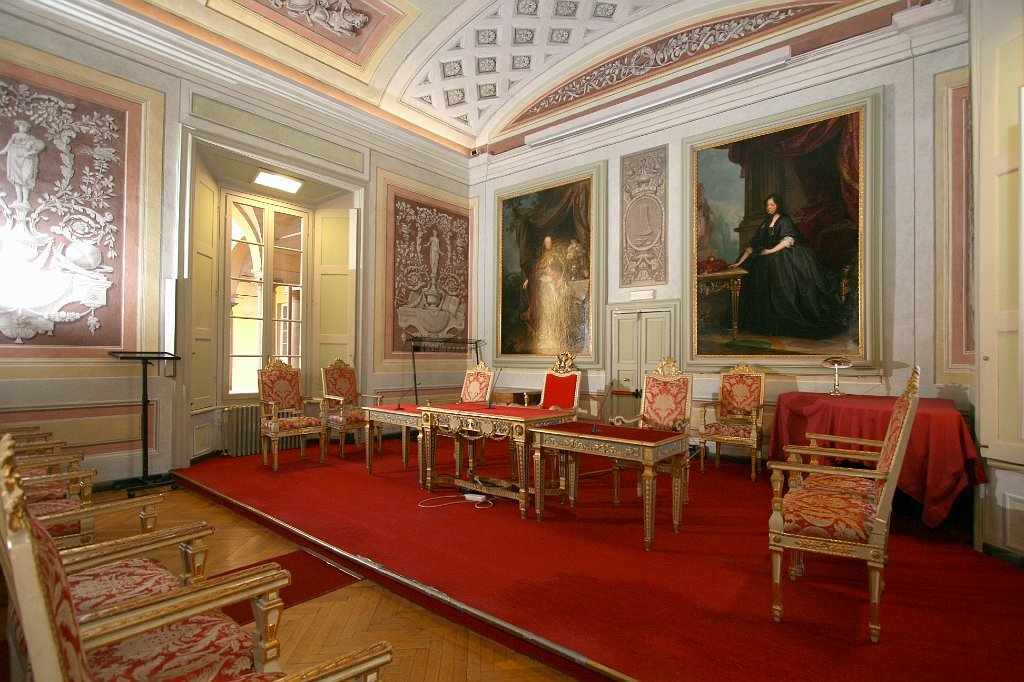
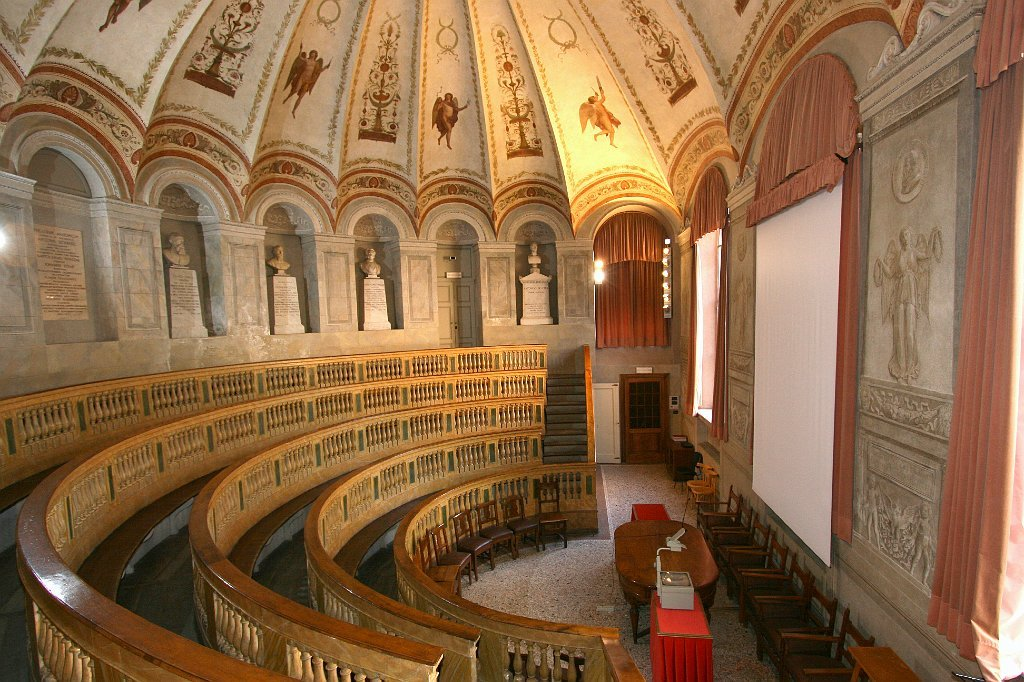
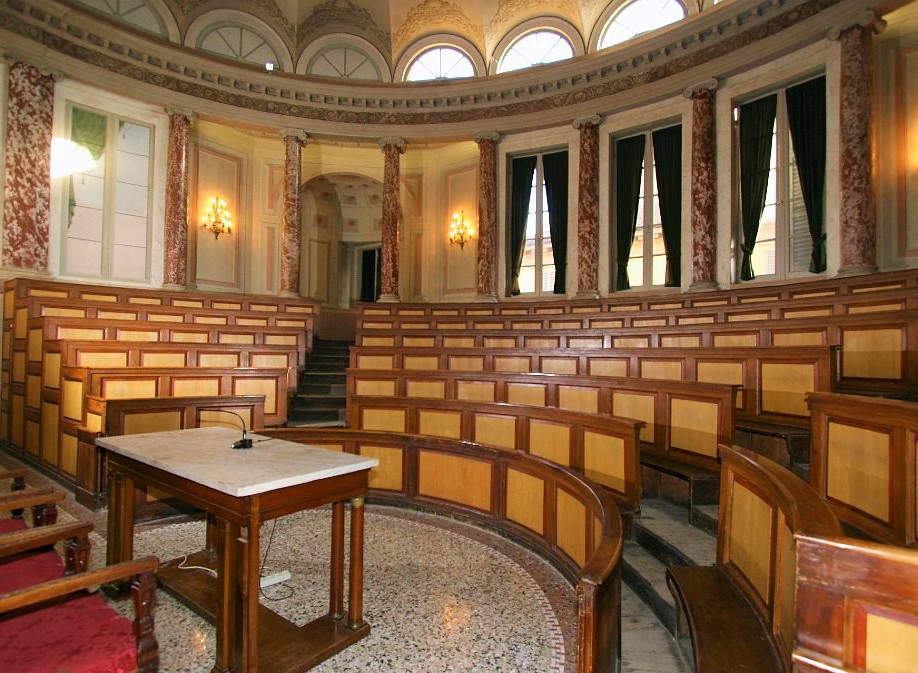
The library (1772), the Foscolo hall (1775- 1782), the Scarpa hall (1785- 1786), the Volta hall (1787).

Between 1819 and 1850 the complex underwent a new expansion, in fact, with the acquisition and subsequent demolition, of the southern part of the former monastery of the Leano and the respective church, two other courtyards with porticoes were built on a project by Giuseppe Marchesi, where numerous epigraphs and stone finds from the Roman age were placed walled up under the arcades, while, between 1822 and 1823 the great staircase was built.

The new large hall was also built between 1845 and 1850, initially designed by Giuseppe Marchesi, but built under the direction of Giovanni Battista Vergani. Also in the same years, due to the demolition of many religious buildings in the city, many epigraphs and tomb monuments were recovered, especially from the fifteenth and sixteenth centuries, of university professors who were positioned under the arcades of the courtyards and in particular in the Volta courtyard, where the great funeral monument of Andrea Alciato and the earthen slab of Baldus de Ubaldis are kept.

In 1932 the complex underwent a new large expansion, in fact the San Matteo hospital was transferred to the new clinics built in viale Golgi, and the university therefore acquired the neighboring fifteenth-century complex of the former hospital.

== Old San Matteo hospital ==
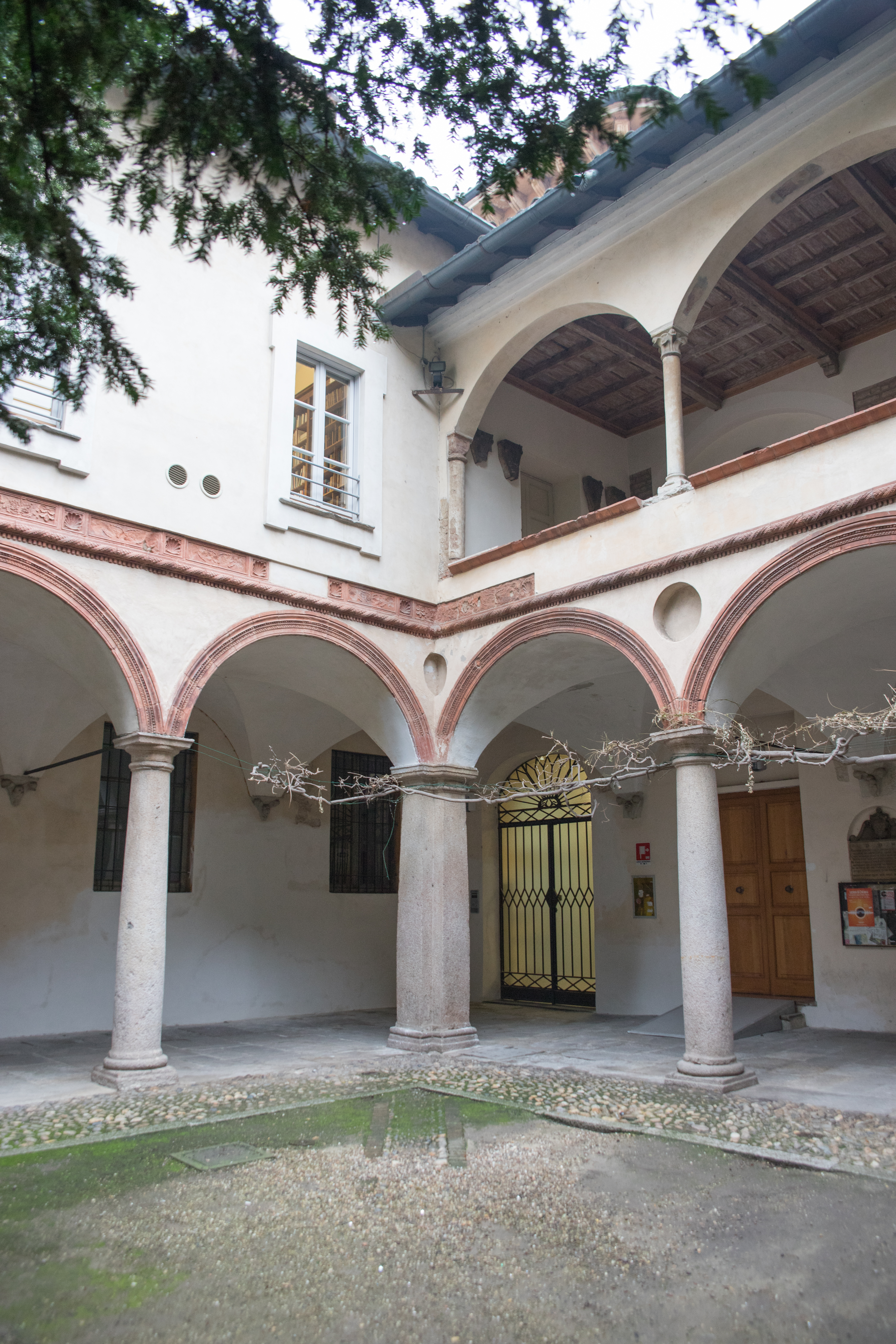
One of the courtyards Old San Matteo hospital

In 1448, twelve citizens of Pavia, coming from both the aristocracy and the bourgeois and mercantile classes, gave life to a brotherhood destined to create a modern welfare and charitable institution, providing not only for the distribution of food and basic necessities to poor, but also to the care and reception of the sick, which later became the main purpose of the institution, with the exclusion of individuals affected by contagious diseases, for which there were other structures in the city. The impetus for the construction of the new hospital came from the preaching of the Dominican friar Dominic of Catalonia, who had moved from Bologna to Pavia around 1450, and in the new location he soon gained the esteem of the major urban classes. He was also responsible for the statutes of the hospital, drawn up in 1451. In 1449 the new institution was recognized and endowed with privileges by both Francesco Sforza, the bishop of Pavia and Pope Nicholas V and, in the area where the ancient priory of San Matteo, the bishop Giacomo Borromeo laid the first stone of the building.

The hospital project was carried out by master Antonio Varassio "de Burgo", himself a member of the brotherhood that set out to build the new hospital, which was sent to Florence, to view the hospital of Santa Maria Nuova and Brescia, where from a new large clinic was soon built in order to identify models for the new hospital in Pavia. The plan, in the shape of a cross inscribed in a square within which four courtyards open, is very similar to that adopted, again in the same years, by Filarete for the Ca 'Granda in Milan, highlighting a notable opening towards the new architectural dictates Renaissance that, in those years, from Florence were radiating towards Lombardy.

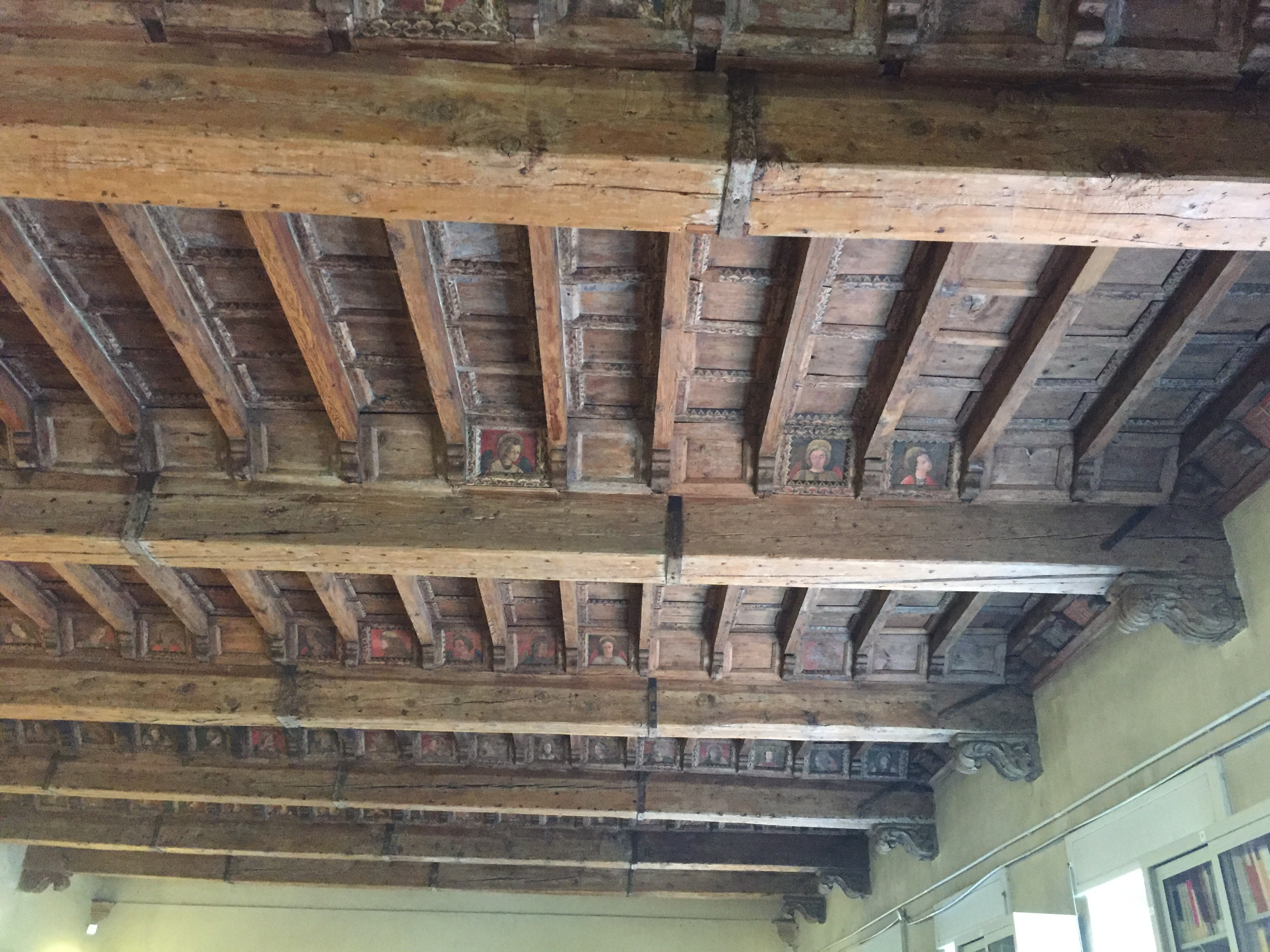
The wooden ceiling of one of the rooms of the former San Matteo Hospital

The cross is made up of two large corridors, where the inmates were housed, crossed, so as to form four porticoed courtyards, while the perimeter was made up of buildings intended for service rooms. All the courtyards are equipped with arcades and in particular the south-west one, called Sforzesco, so called the terracotta decorations depicting the quince, the heraldic emblem of Francesco Sforza, made by the Cremonese Rinaldo De Stauris in 1484, and provided also of loggetta. The roof with wooden beams, painted in the fifteenth century with figures of angels, in the rooms of the south arm that housed the Art History Library, overlooking the charming courtyard of the Magnolias, is also original.

== Bibliography ==
- Luisa Erba, Il neoclassicismo a Pavia dal 1770 al 1792, in Banca Regionale Europea (a cura di), Storia di Pavia. L'età spagnola e austriaca, IV (tomo II), Milano, Industrie Grafiche P. M., 1995
- Susanna Zatti (a cura di), Pavia neoclassica. La riforma urbana 1770- 1840, Vigevano, Diakronia, 1994.
- Agostino Sottili, Università e cultura a Pavia in età visconteo-sforzesca, in Banca Regionale Europea (a cura di), Storia di Pavia. Dal libero comune alla fine del principato indipendente 1024- 1535, III (tomo II), Milano, Industrie Grafiche P. M., 1990.
