= Vernavola Park =

Park in Pavia, Italy

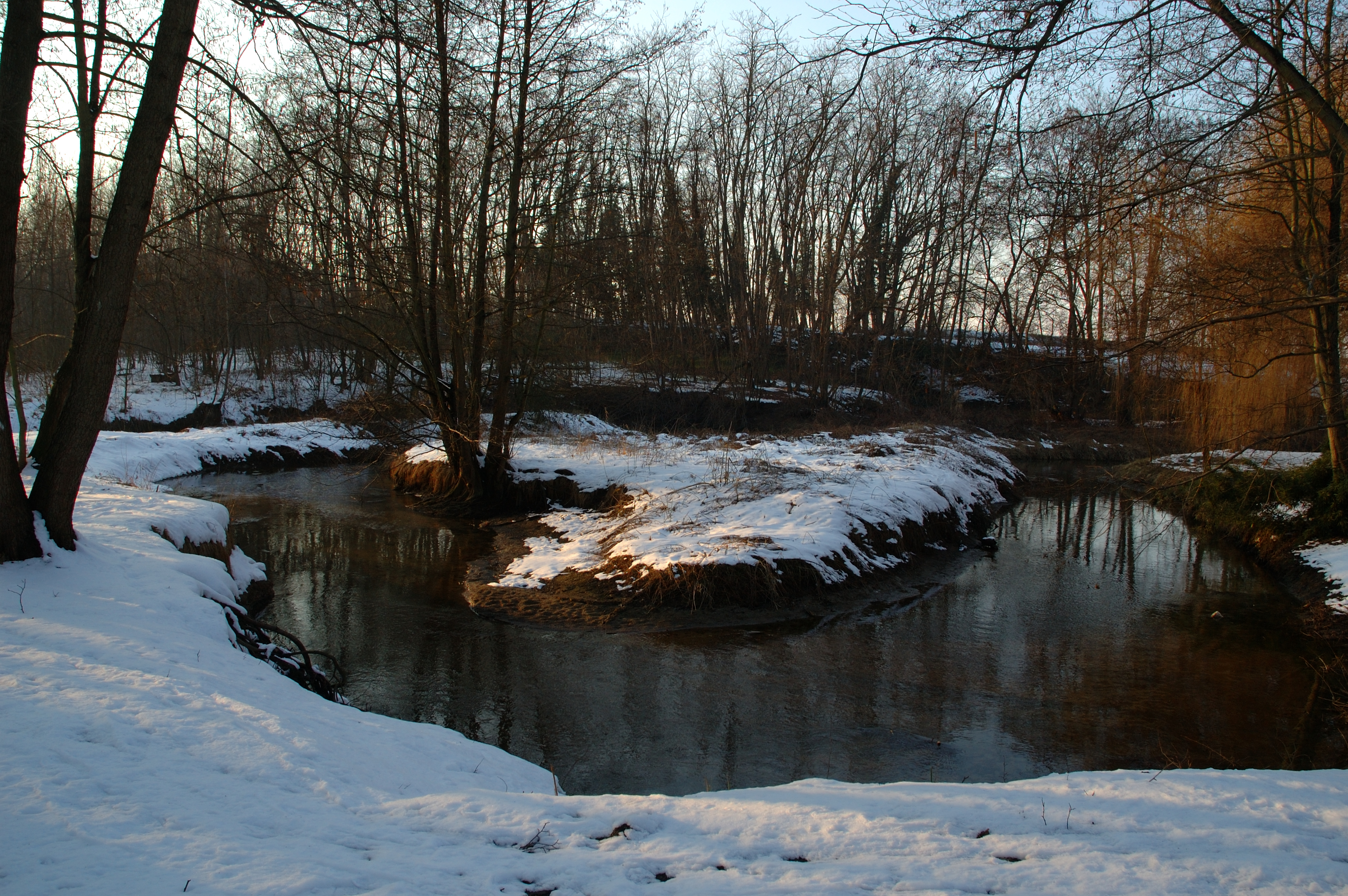
- Interactive map of Vernavola Park
- Type: Nature reserve
- Location: Pavia, Italy
- Coordinates: 45°12′28″N 9°10′02″E
- Created: 1985
- Operator: Municipality of Pavia
- Website: www.comune.pv.it/site/home/articolo622.html

The Vernavola Park is a nature reserve located in the municipality of Pavia, of which it is the largest green area. The park, about 35 hectares (86 acres) wide, takes its name from the Vernavola stream, a small watercourse about 15 kilometres (9.3 mi) long and a tributary of the Ticino, which crosses the park with numerous meanders.

== History ==
Established in 1985 and recognized by the Lombardy Region as a Naturalistic Zone within the Ticino Valley Natural Park, in the following years the park was enlarged and equipped with a children's play area, cycle paths and benches. It is home to a riding school and the Colombara farmhouse, where you can observe the farm animals and a small museum on peasant life. Vernavola Park is what remains of the ancient Visconti Park, and because of this is worth a visit. It is located at the center of the “old park” built by Galeazzo II Visconti around 1360 and then expanded by Gian Galeazzo Visconti around 1390. It was used by the Visconti family as a hunting area. Inside the park, around the area of Mirabello Castle, is where the Battle of Pavia took place in 1525.

== Flora and fauna ==
It is a reserve crossed in part by a botanical path, characterized by many tree species including white birch,

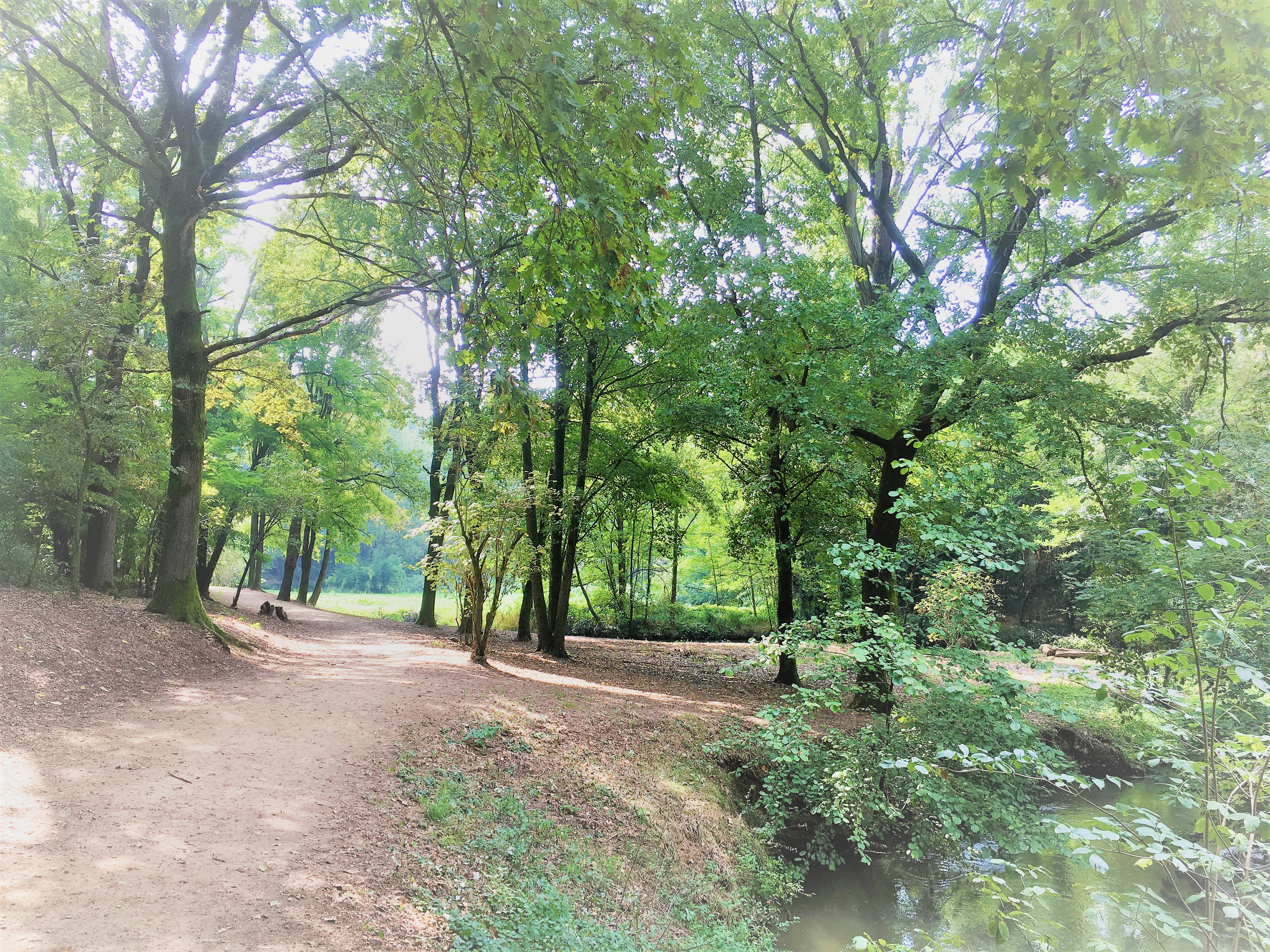
One of the paths of the Park.

sour cherry, ash, wild apple, hazel, field elm, alder, English oak and various poplars and willows. A composite natural environment, where, at the entrance on via Torretta, there is also a small lake where mallards, mute swans, black swans and common moorhens live. Further inside is the alder forest with eurasian hoopoes, greenfinches and chaffinches among the thick branches. The park is also populated by a rich fauna: pheasants, foxes, hares, wild rabbits and, recently, wild boars.
