= Palazzo Malaspina, Pavia =

16th century civic palace in Italy

Coordinates: 45.18763°N 9.15459°E

Palazzo Malaspina
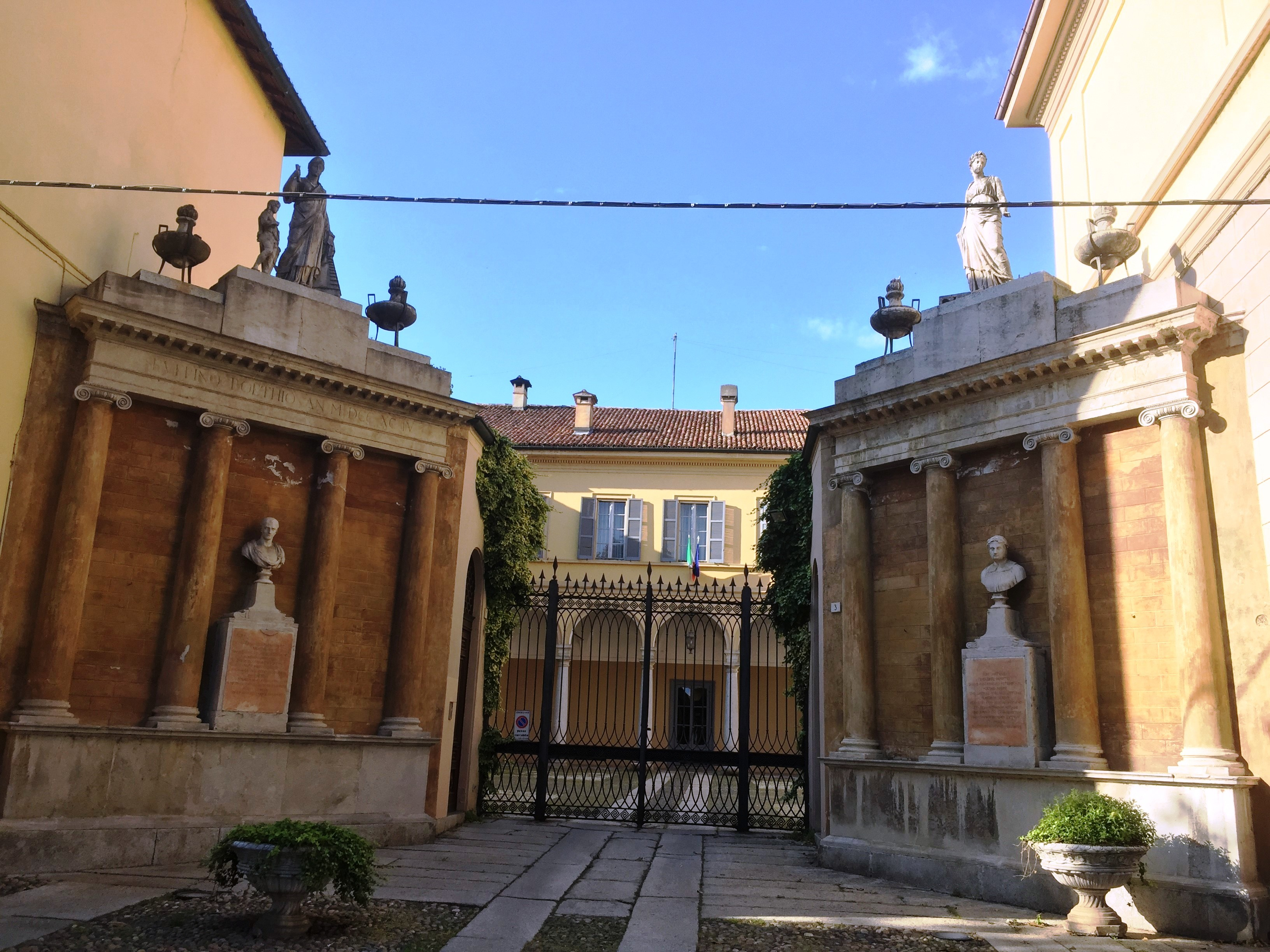
- Facade
- Interactive map of the Palazzo Malaspina area

General information
- Type: Palace
- Architectural style: Neoclassicism
- Location: Pavia, Italy
- Opened: 1794
- Owner: City Council of Pavia

Design and construction
- Architect: Marquis Luigi Malaspina di Sannazzaro

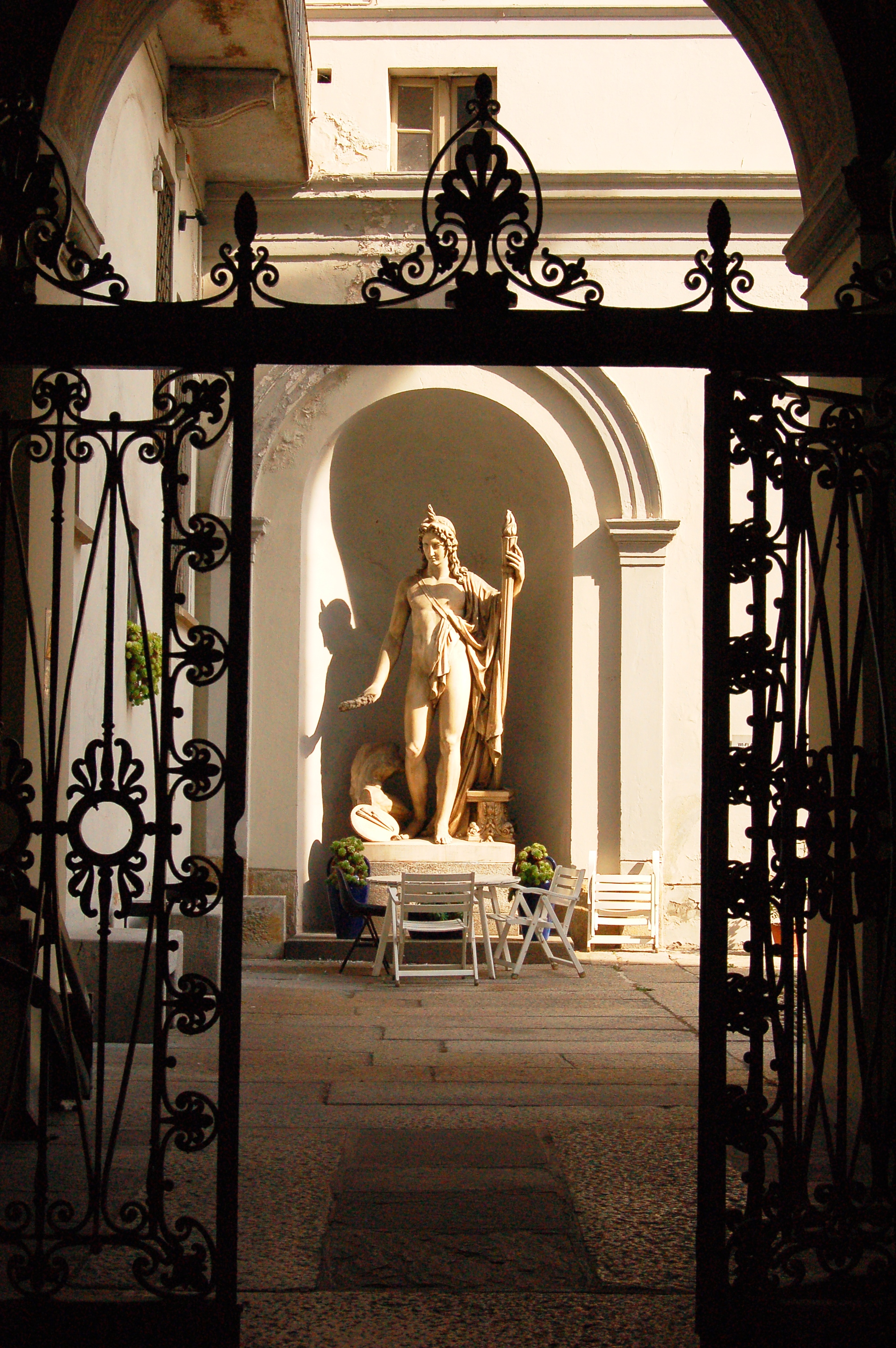
Corner of the first courtyard

The Palazzo Malaspina is a Baroque and Neoclassical-style palace with two facades: one on Via Malaspina #9, and a second entry to the Civic archive and library (Biblioteca Civica Carlo Bonetta) facing Piazza Petrarca on Via Valla #2 in the town of Pavia, region of Lombardy, Italy.

The original 16th-century palace was accessed through the entrance at Via Malaspina, and was refurbished by the Marquis Luigi Malaspina di Sannazaro (1754-1835). The iron gate is flanked by two converging screens with an eclectic array of decoration. On each side, two columns each flank a marble bust. From the street, the screen on the right has a bust of Boethius, the one on the left depicts Petrarch. One representing the rational enterprise, the other the poetic enterprise. The allegorical figures atop reinforce these themes. Beyond the elegantly decorated iron gate is the main entrance through a portico of five arches, it leads to a grand staircase. The piano nobile has various frescoed and stuccoed rooms.

The entrance of Piazza Petrarca was completed in by 1835 has a more sober neoclassical facade.

The Marchese Malaspina was proud of his collection of art and archeological artifacts. In 1838 part of this palace was designated the Stabilimento di Belle Arti Malaspina, and served as a civic museum. In 1977, the Pinacoteca Malaspina was brought together with other collections to the Castello Visconteo. The building is now home to the Carlo Bonetta Library and the Historical Civic Archive of the City Council of Pavia.
