= Mirabello di Pavia =

Coordinates: 45.219°N 9.166°E

Mirabello di Pavia (Northern Italy)

Mirabello is a suburb of Pavia, Lombardy, northern Italy. It lies north of the city, bordering San Genesio ed Uniti.

== History ==
Mirabello was the main center of the Old Park (Parco Vecchio) and the residence of Captain of the Park. The Old Park was the older part of the vast park created by the Visconti family linking the Castle of Pavia with Certosa. After the downfall of the House of Sforza and the decadence of the Park, Mirabello remained as an autonomous administrative entity. In the 18th century the commune of Torre Pescarina is united to Mirabello, and in 1841 the commune of Cantugno was also added. In 1863 the comune takes the name of Mirabello e Uniti di Pavia. In 1883 some fractions (Scala and Torretta among others) are united with the comune of Pavia. In 1939 the comune is suppressed and united to Pavia and partly to San Genesio ed Uniti.

== Demography ==
Demographic evolution

- 700 residents in 1751
- 916 in 1805
- 1.802 in 1861

== See also ==
- Mirabello Castle

== Bibliography ==
- Gianani, Faustino; Ogliari, Francesco (2005). Mirabello di Pavia. Il parco, la battaglia, la parrocchia. Pavia: Selecta Editrice. ISBN 8873321186.
