= Mirabello Castle =

Castle in northern Italy

- Castello di Mirabello
- Part of Visconti Park
- Mirabello di Pavia, Pavia, Lombardy, Northern Italy
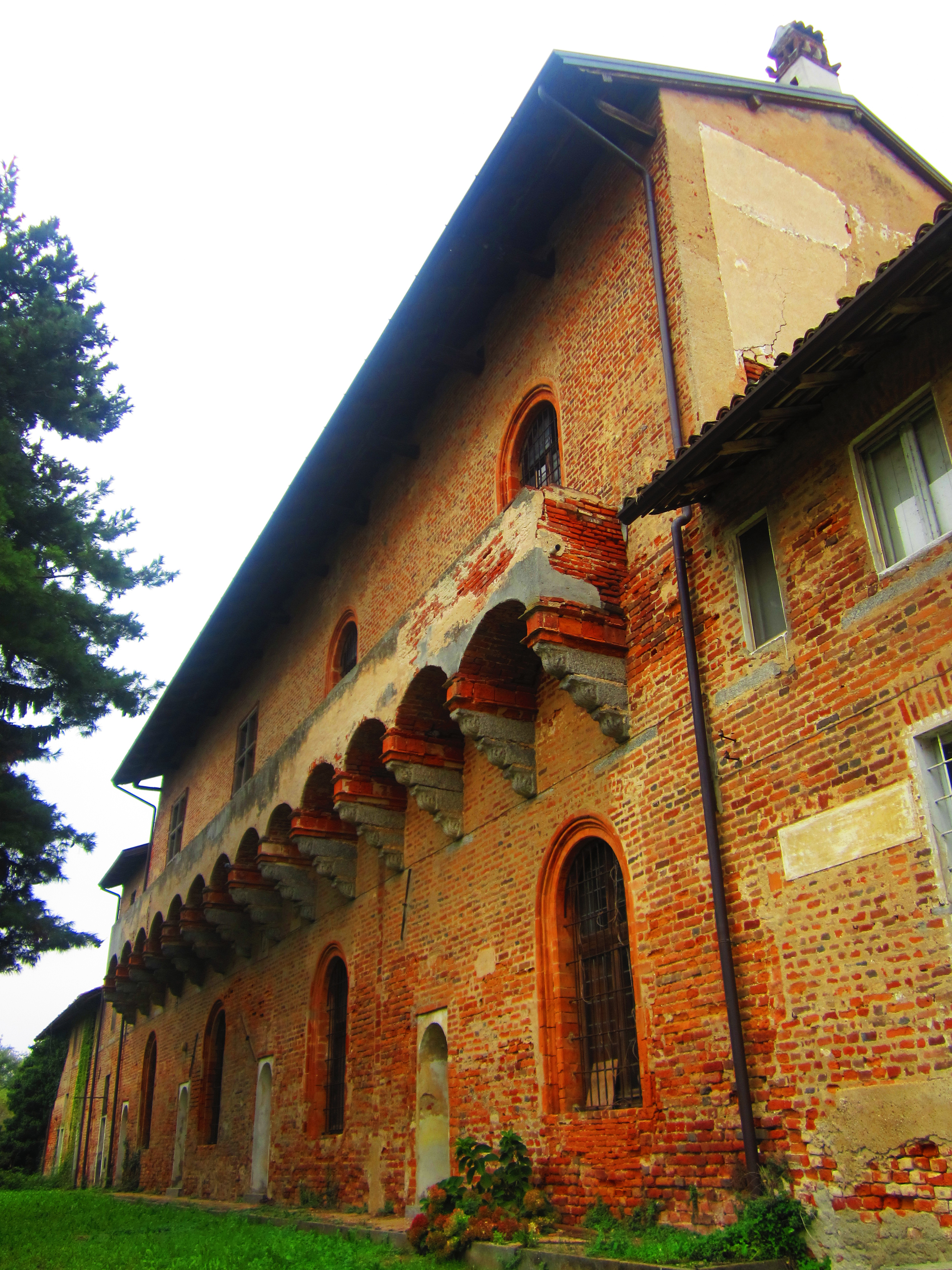
- The internal court

Site information
- Type: Medieval castle, Mansion
- Owner: Municipality of Pavia
- Open to the public: No

Location
- Coordinates: 45°13′10″N 9°10′01″E

Site history
- Built: 14th century
- Built by: Fiamberti family, Galeazzo II Visconti
- Materials: Bricks
- Battles/wars: Pavia (1525, Italian War of 1521–1526)

The Mirabello Castle lies in what was once the Parco Visconteo, near Mirabello di Pavia. Between the 14th and 16th centuries, it was the seat of the Captain of the Park, the authority administering the Parco Visconteo on behalf of the Visconti and Sforza families. Only a wing of the original castle has survived.

== History ==
Since the 12th century, the area had been occupied by a Cistercian monastery, extended between the Mischia and Carone rivers, immediately north of the town of Mirabello. In 1325 the Fiamberti family of Pavia acquired goods and lands in the area. They probably built the first castle between 1325 and 1341.

In the second half of the 14th century, Galeazzo II Visconti and his son Gian Galeazzo created the Visconti Park, which extended from the Pavia Visconti Castle to the Pavia Charterhouse, located 7 km north, and comprised Mirabello. A document of 1367 reports the sale of the southern part of the Mirabello Castle from Gasparino Fiamberti to Gian Galeazzo Visconti. Between 1383 and 1384, Gian Galeazzo Visconti destroyed the religious settlement to extend the Visconti Park to the north. The Mirabello Castle was incorporated in the Visconti Park and transformed from a military installation into a hunting and leisure manor. The castle was connected to the Pavia Castle by the Corso, a long tree-lined avenue used for horse races.

In the 15th century, with Gian Galeazzo's son Filippo Maria Visconti, a Park Official (later named Captain of the Park) with administrative headquarters in Mirabello began to appear in the documents. Galeazzo Sanseverino inherited Mirabello probably in 1494, on the death of Duke Gian Galeazzo Sforza. He renovated the castle between 1501 and 1522, enlarging its western wing and adding the balcony with a masonry parapet. The King of France, the Duke of Alençon (brother-in-law of Francesco I), and Galeazzo Sanseverino himself (Grand Squire of France since 1505) stayed in the building in the months preceding the battle of 24 February 1525, during which Galeazzo died like many other nobles of the French army.

The Mirabello Castle is depicted in a fresco painted at the beginning of the 16th century in the San Teodoro church in Pavia and attributed to Bernardino Lanzani. It appears from the south, behind the Pavia Visconti Castle, among other buildings of the Visconti Park. Mullioned windows are visible on its southern wall.

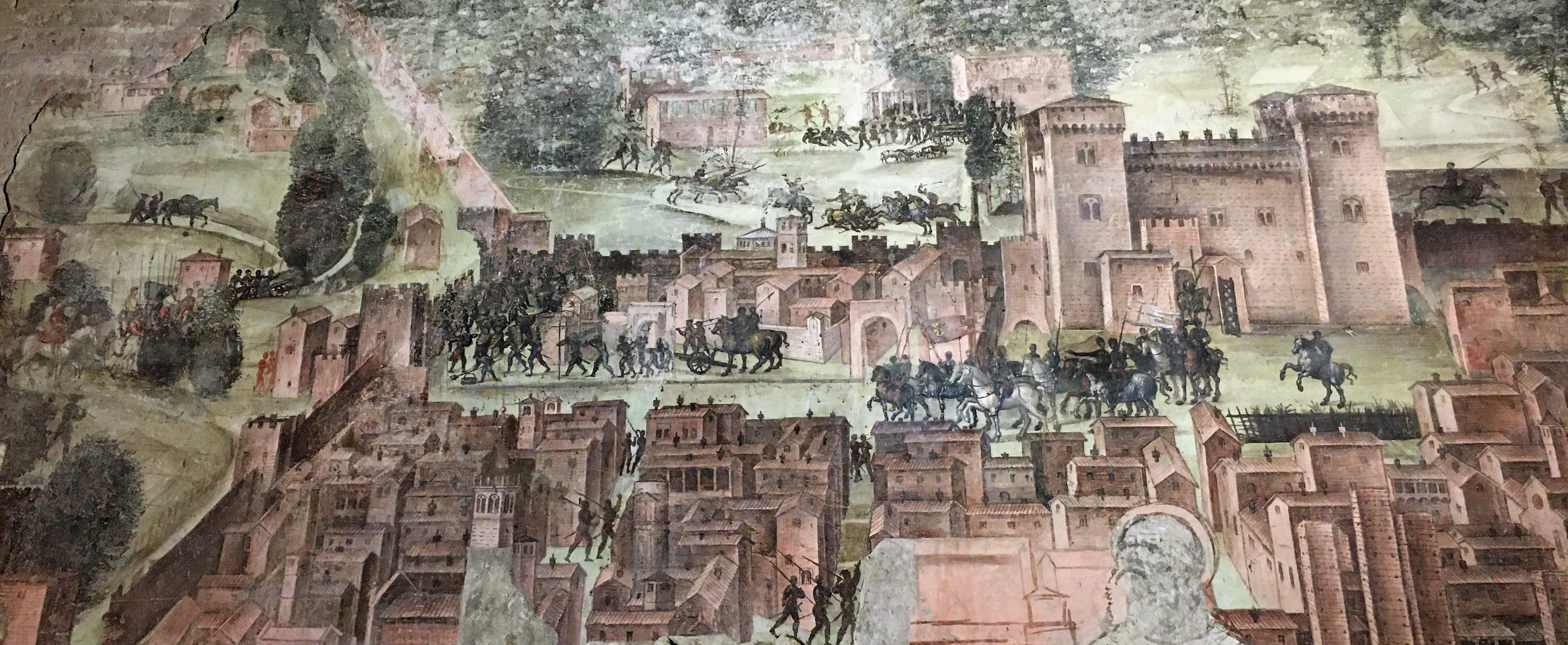
A fresco in the San Teodoro church in Pavia, attributed to Bernardino Lanzani, portrays the Mirabella Castle beyond the Visconti Castle with other nearby buildings of the Visconti Park

Upon the death of Duke Francesco II Sforza, Pavia passed under the direct control of Charles V of Habsburg. The Visconti Park continued to be administered by a Captain, first by Cristoforo Funk, then by his son Sforza, who died in 1602. The Captain of the Park continued to exist and became the prerogative of the Casati family. Alfonso took up the post in 1604 and was succeeded in 1622 by his son Carlo Emanuele. In 1730, the Casati extinguished. The Park's administration passed to Pirro de Capitanei and later to his brother Carlo Giuseppe.

In 1737, burdened by debts, the administration decided to make an accurate estimate of the lands and buildings within the Parco Vecchio and sell them. In 1754, Marquis Antonio Clerici bought the Mirabello Castle and the annexed buildings.

In July 1767, the daughter of Marquis Clerici sold the Visconti Park estates, including the buildings in Mirabello, to the San Matteo Hospital in Pavia. The Mirabello Castle was used as a farmhouse for about sixty years until the mid-19th century. In 1854, due to the precarious conditions, the San Matteo Hospital carried out restorations. At the end of the restoration works, the San Matteo Hospital rented the Castle to the Municipality of Mirabello, which used the ground floor rooms as an elementary school and the main floor as offices. Other minor interventions were carried out in the building in the following years. At the beginning of the 20th century, the fifteenth-century wing perpendicular to the Castle was demolished. Some restructuring of the two lateral parts of the Castle followed in 1958, creating eight single-family apartments.

The castle belonged to the Policlinico San Matteo until the beginning of the 21st century. It was then sold to the Pavia Municipality.

== Today ==
The Mirabello Castle is closed to the public and can only be seen from the nearby road. It is expected to be the seat of the future Museum of the Battle of Pavia. Two coats of arms with France and the Sanseverinos symbols recovered during the restoration works were placed in the center of the castle facade, where today are visible.

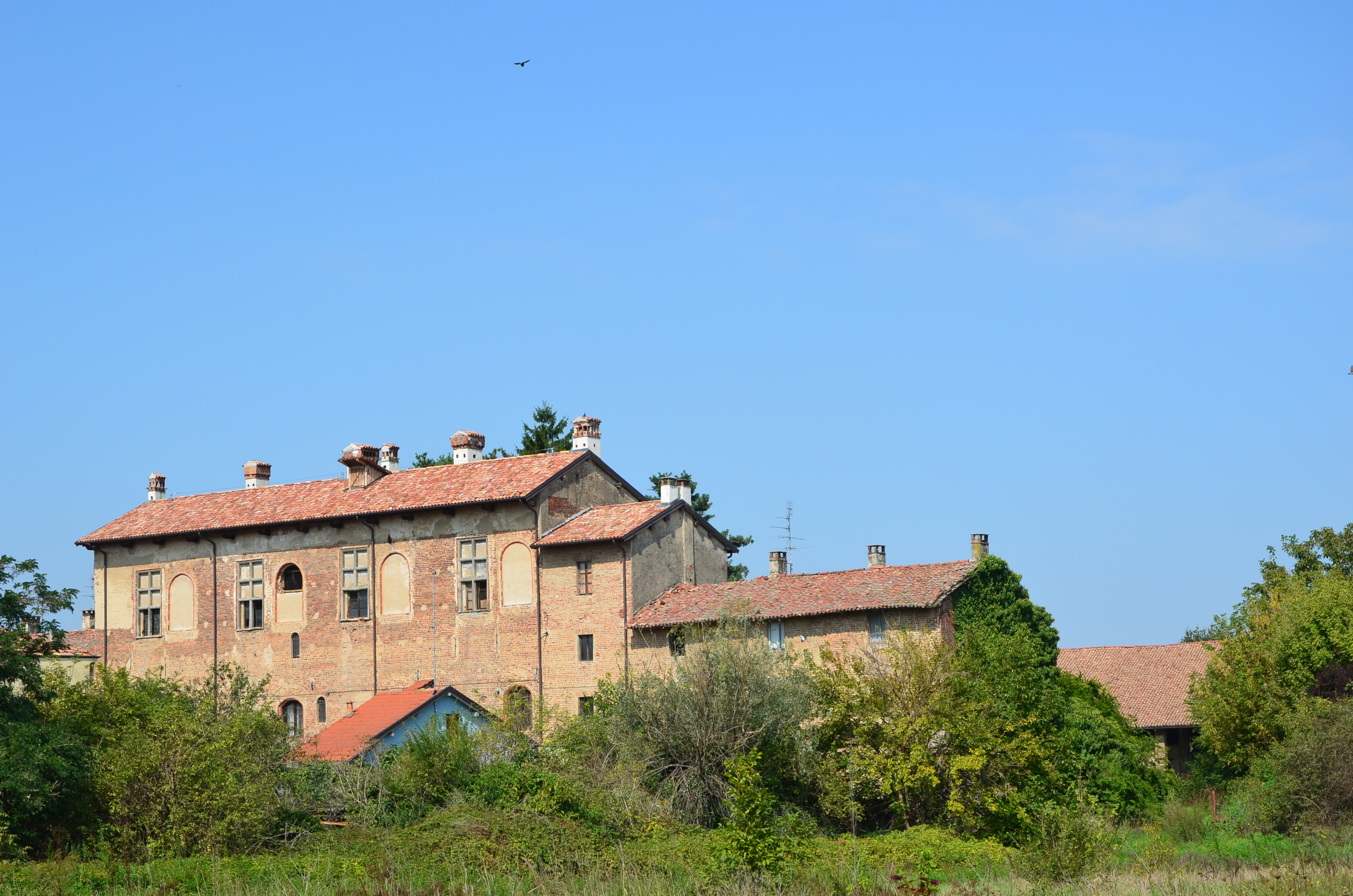
The Mirabello Castle seen from south

== Sources ==
- Galandra, Marco (2017). Il Castello di Mirabello. Storia ed immagini. Pavia: Luigi Ponzio e figli Editori in Pavia.
- Conti, Flavio; Hybsch, Vincenzo; Vincenti, Antonello (1990). I castelli della Lombardia. Provincie di Milano e Pavia (in Italian). Novara: Istituto Geografico de Agostini. ISBN 88-402-9108-3.
