= Torre del Mangano =

- Frazione
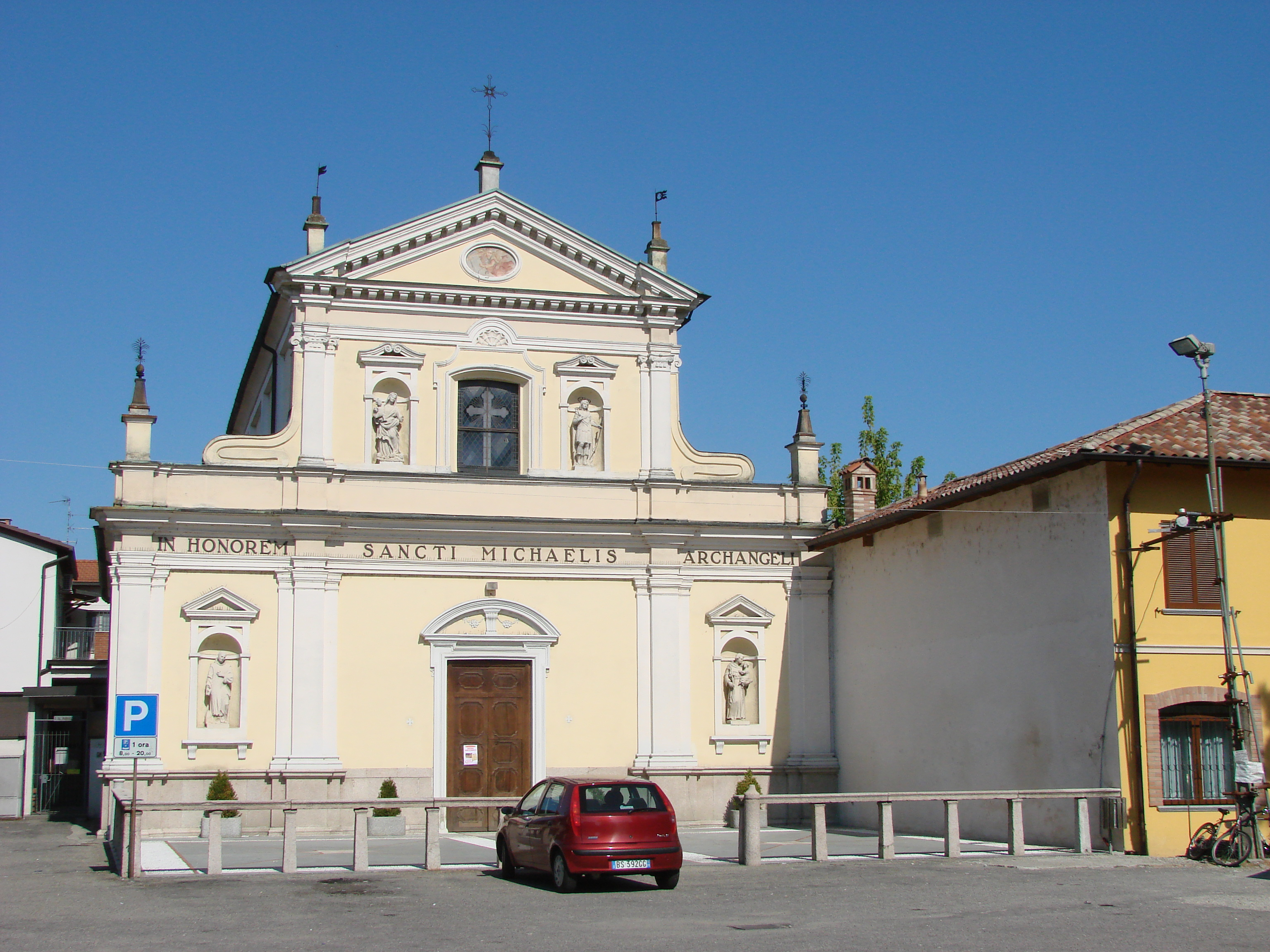
- Saint Michael church

- Location of Torre del Mangano in Italy
- Coordinates: 45°15′01″N 9°07′38″E
- Country: Italy
- Region: Lombardy
- Province: Pavia (PV)
- Comune: Certosa di Pavia
- Time zone: UTC+1 (CET)
  - Summer (DST): UTC+2 (CEST)

Torre del Mangano is a frazione and the seat of the municipality of the Certosa di Pavia comune. The comune bore the name of Torre del Mangano until 1929, when the villages of Borgarello, Torriano and Torre del Mangano merged. They assumed the name of Certosa di Pavia because of the great notoriety of the charterhouse located in the nearby. The church of the local parish is dedicated to Saint Michael.

Torre del Mangano is situated on the corner of what was once the Visconti Park. The remains of one of its gate are visible near the Saint Michael church.
