= Visconti Park =

Former princely park in Lombardy, Italy

- Parco Visconteo
- The park between the Pavia Castle (south) and the Pavia Charterhouse (north) overlaid on today’s map
- Type: Princely park
- Location: Duchy of Milan
- Nearest city: Pavia
- Coordinates: 45°13′10″N 9°10′01″E
- Area: 2,200 hectares (5,400 acres)
- Created: 1360 (Old Park), 1390 (New Park)
- Founder: Galeazzo II Visconti
- Owner: Visconti and Sforza houses
- Operator: Captain of the Park (based in Mirabello Castle)
- Status: Disused

Visconti Park (Parco Visconteo in Italian) was the private park of the Visconti and Sforza families, lords, and dukes of Milan. Located in Lombardy, northern Italy, it extended between Pavia Castle and the Certosa di Pavia monastery. It covered an area of about 2,200 hectares (22 km^{2}) and was encircled by walls about 25 kilometres (16 mi) in length. It was founded in 1360 by Galeazzo II Visconti and enlarged by his son Gian Galeazzo.

It was used for hunting and as a pleasure ground with various features. Its decay began in 1525 with the damages inflicted during the important Battle of Pavia, which was largely fought (by over 50,000 troops) inside the park. Today, the park's old area is mainly farmland, while some portions are nature reserves.

== The original park ==
Visconti Park was part of the project of Pavia Castle, built after 1361 by the decision of Galeazzo II Visconti. The idea to reserve a large area north of the castle for the private leisure and hunting of the Visconti family goes back to the same period. About thirty years later, Gian Galeazzo Visconti added a further portion of land (Parco Nuovo, the New Park) to the first part (Parco Vecchio, the Old Park). With this extension, the park reached the Certosa di Pavia ("Pavia Charterhouse"), founded at the end of the century by the Visconti to host their family mausoleum, covering about 2,200 hectares (22 km^{2}).

The park was encircled by walls and accessible by gates. The total wall length along the park's perimeter was about 22 kilometres (14 mi). Manors, farmsteads, ponds with hydraulic arrangements, and pathways were built inside the park. The Mirabello Castle, the seat of the authority administering the park (Captain of the Park), was erected at its center. In some parts, the vegetation was designed for recreational purposes or to accommodate animal species. Elsewhere, the agricultural activities were similar to the areas external to the park.

Visconti Park is considered an archetype of modern parks as an area set aside by local authorities and modified with landscape architecture techniques; the famous park at Hesdin belonging to the counts of Anjou, followed by the Dukes of Burgundy, was rather earlier. In its hunting purposes, it compares to the English deer parks. The complex of Visconti Park, Pavia Castle, and the Certosa di Pavia constitute the first example in Europe of a royal palace connected to an enclosed park with a private chapel and other buildings. The nearest example visible today is Monza's royal villa and park, realized about four centuries later.

=== Flora and fauna ===
While maintaining vast agricultural spaces, the park was characterized by the presence of large wooded areas, planting according to a precise landscape project: they were in fact placed along the edges, leaving the central body free, crossed by the Vernavola valley (in turn delineated only one band of alders), so that the visitors' gaze could wander and perceive the grandeur of the park. Even the woods were carefully studied, they were in fact characterized by the presence of a main essence for each tree mass, thus obtaining the "oak forest", "chestnut" and "elm". The park was home to a very rich fauna: in the Sforza period the number of deer, fallow deer and roe deer was said to exceed 5,000, as well as many hares, pheasants, partridges and quail. There were also bears (mainly placed in a menagerie called "orsaia") and ostriches. We also know that during the summer, to prevent animals from damaging the crops, fences and delimited areas were set up.

=== Reputation abroad and symbolic value ===
The fame of the park was widespread throughout Europe, Geoffrey Chaucer, who perhaps had the opportunity to visit it during his stay at the Visconti court in 1378, probably referred to it by describing the garden of the nobleman in the Canterbury tales Cavaliere Pavese January: «so beautiful that I don't know another equal in any place». Surely for Galeazzo II, and even more so for Gian Galeazzo, the park also had a strong symbolic value: the ancient royal palace of Pavia, seat of the Lombard kings and those of the kingdom of Italy, had a large garden (viridarium), with the creation of the large park, the Viscontis therefore intended to reconnect with that past, manifesting their royal aspirations. In fact, the park was not intended only for entertainment, hunts and tournaments (one of the most memorable was organized by Galeazzo Maria Sforza in 1471) of the lords, but was used by the Visconti and Sforza as a place of representation, here sovereigns, prelates were brought, ambassadors and all the most important guests, who observing the abundant game, the exotic animals, the beauty of the buildings and the grandeur of the Carthusian complex, thus had the opportunity to touch the grandeur of the dukes of Milan.

== The park in Benedetto Briosco's reliefs ==
In 1501, Benedetto Briosco portrayed Visconti Park in his reliefs decorating the portal of the Pavia Charterhouse.

Briosco represented some features of the park beyond Charterhouse's dome and roof, still under construction, on the day of its consecration. The Visconti Castle of Pavia, with its four towers, is on the opposite side of the park. A tree-lined avenue (Il Corso), used for the ducal horse races, connects Pavia to the Mirabello Castle. The walls surrounding Visconti Park and a gate (Porta di Belgioioso) are visible on the left. In the relief, Briosco also portrayed hunting scenes and people horse riding. Although barely hinted, a man with a spear accompanied by a dog, hunting presumably a deer and a wild boar, is visible to the left of the Charterhouse dome. People on horseback, apparently at leisure, are portrayed to the right.

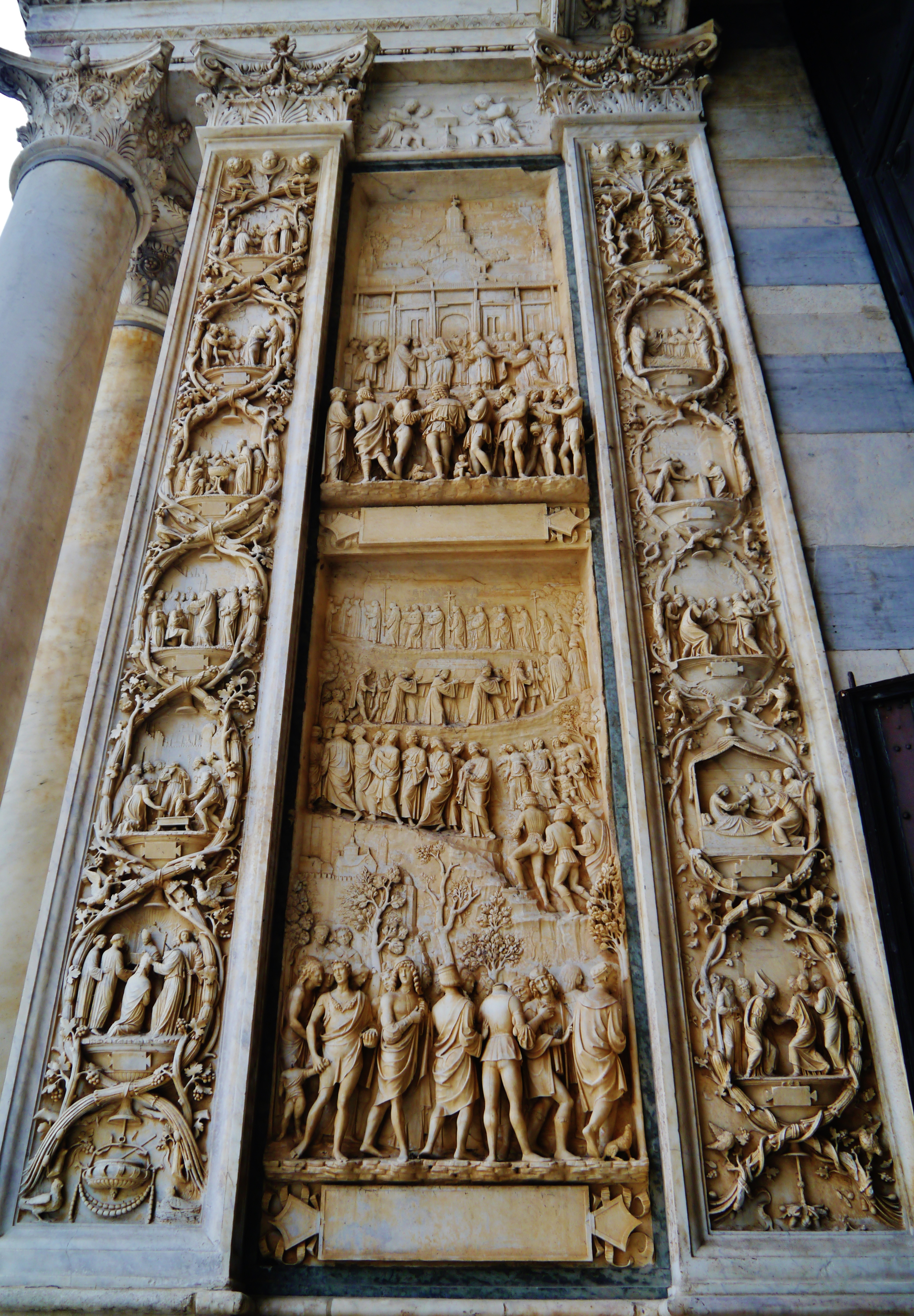
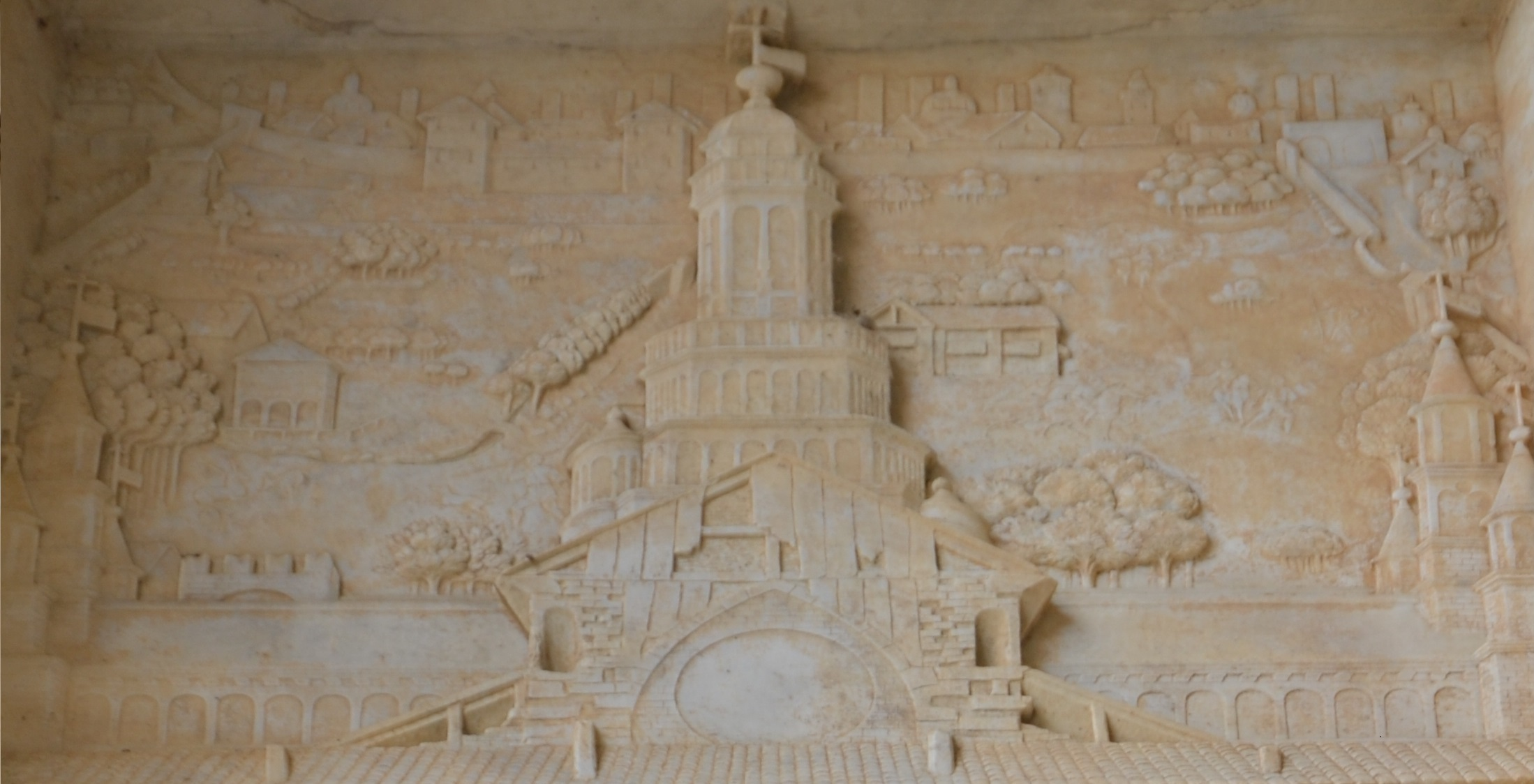
In the reliefs of the beginning of the 16th century by Benedetto Briosco decorating Pavia Charterhouse's portal, Visconti Park was portrayed beyond the Charterhouse dome still under construction.

Another Briosco's relief, dedicated to the ceremony of Charterhouse's foundation, shows a group of people walking and horse riding in the park. Briosco represented this detail in the background of the scene where Gian Galeazzo Visconti lays the foundation stone of the Certosa.

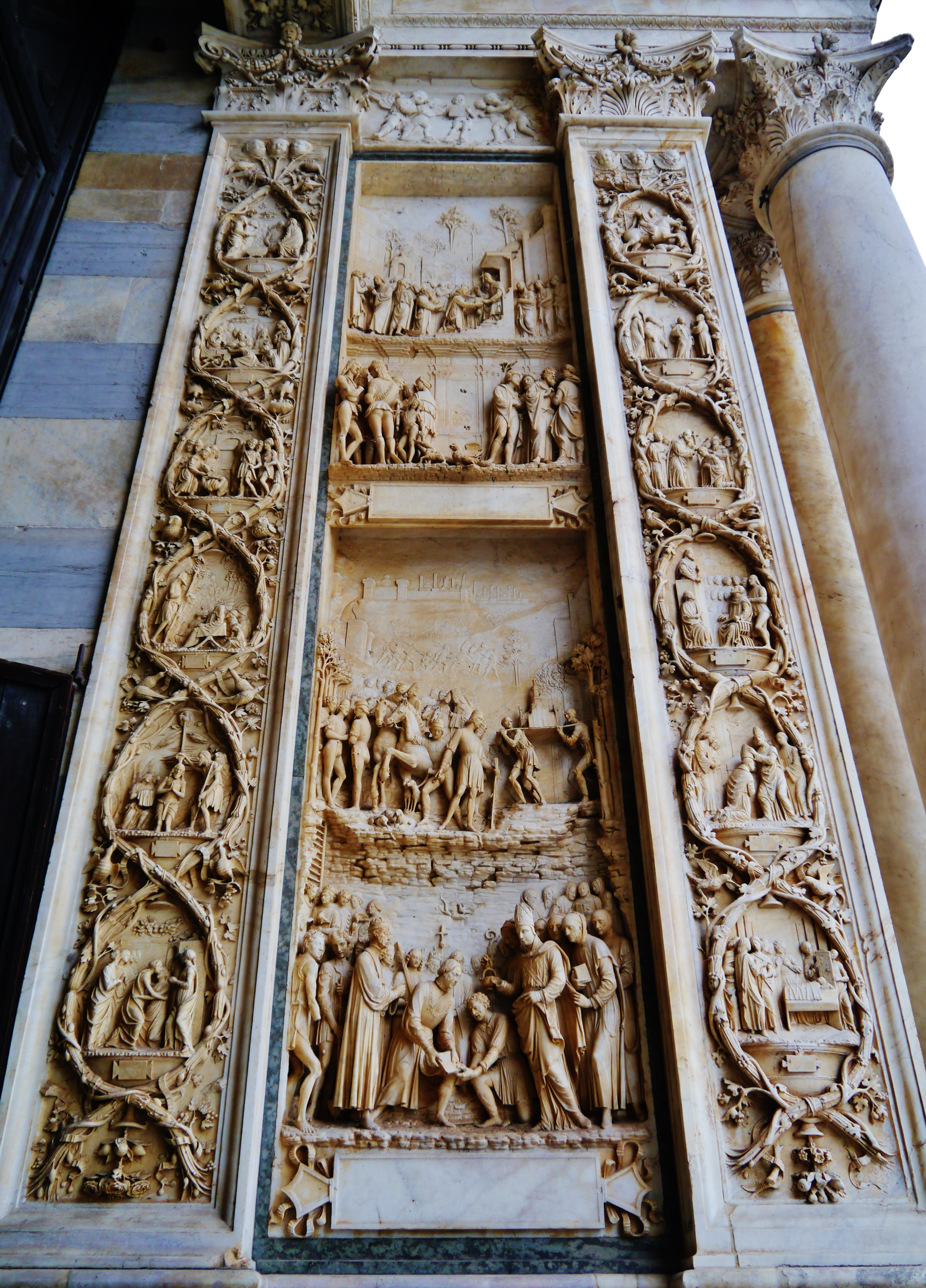
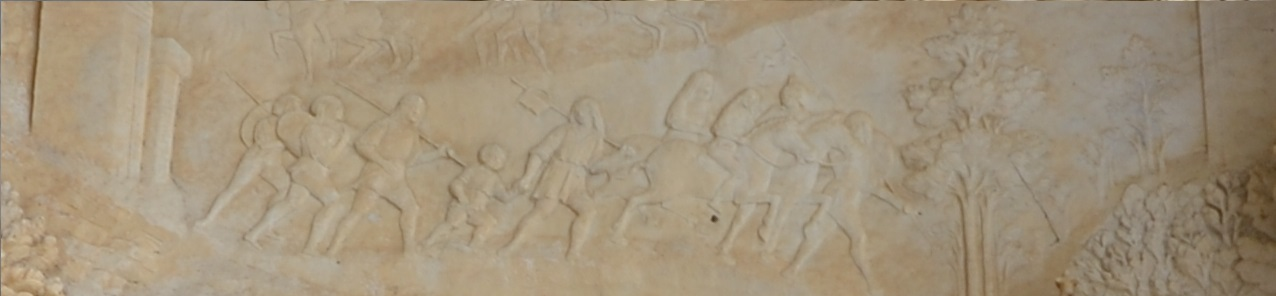
Another detail of Benedetto Briosco's relief portraying the Pavia Charterhouse consecration ceremony shows people walking and horse riding in Visconti Park.

== Structures, buildings and settlements in the park ==
=== The Ducal Bath ===
During the restoration of the buildings in the Park undertaken by Filippo Maria Visconti in 1438, the Great Garden Bathroom is mentioned; the measurements of the plant (which was a real indoor swimming pool), but also the connection with the large fish pond of the same garden, coincide with the famous description by Stefano Breventano (1570), when, with the destruction already occurred at the time of the fall of Ludovico Sforza, there was nothing but the square-shaped basin of 18 steps (equal to about 25 meters on each side), with white marble cladding, once enclosed by larch boards, with four large windows and a roof in the shape of a pavilion. It is not certain, however it is possible that some studies by Leonardo da Vinci for the hot and cold water pipes "of the Duchess's bathroom" were actually referred to the "swimming pool" of the park, even if it has been hypothesized that Leonardo created, around 1490, a new bathroom for Isabella of Aragon. When the bathroom was used by the dukes, to protect their privacy, wooden panels were placed around the structure, in fact there is a letter from Galeazzo Maria Sforza addressed to the captain of the park with which Sforza urged the sending of "doors" in wood for the bathroom.

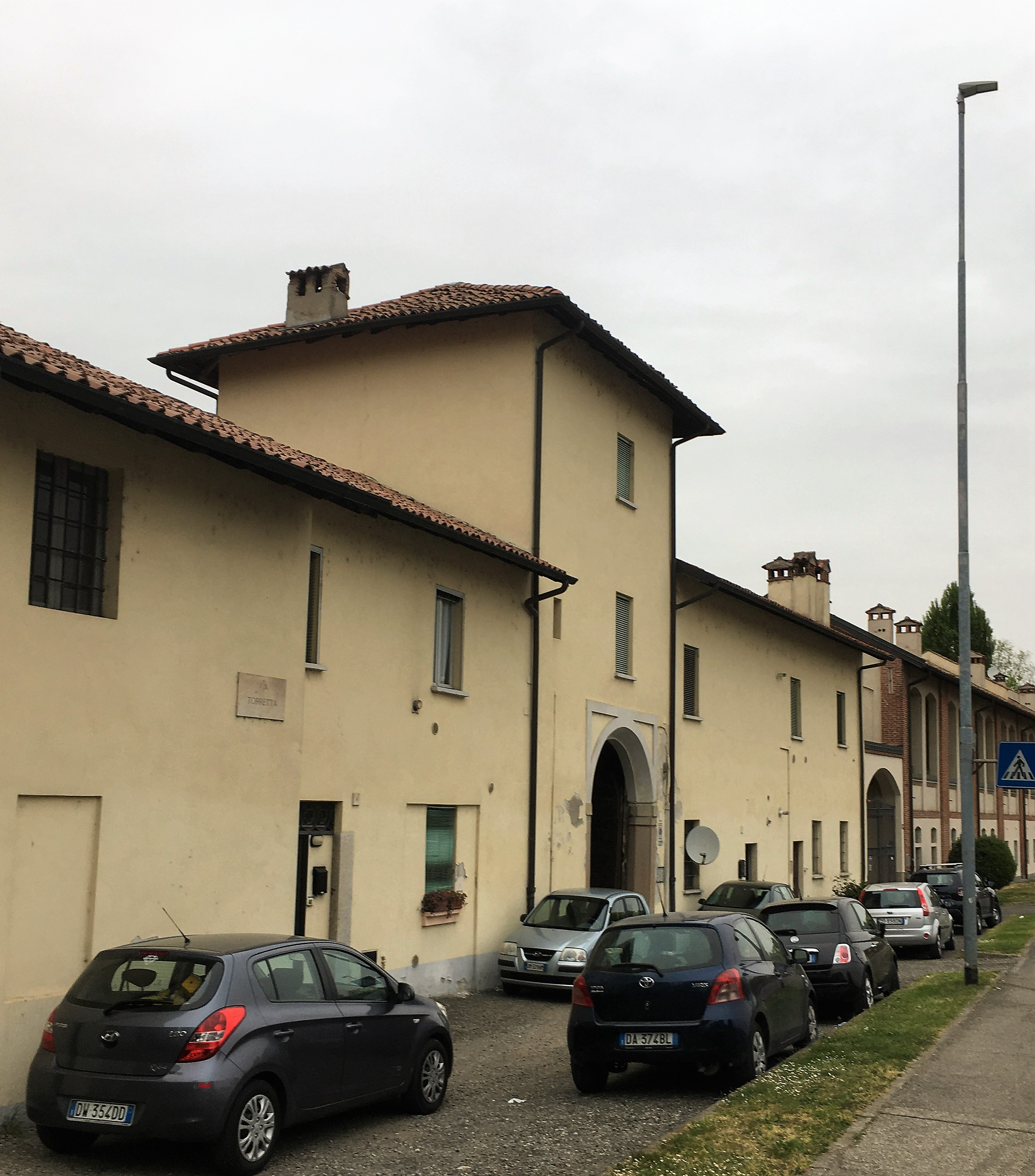
The Torretta

=== The Torretta and the Garden of the Torretta ===
The Torretta complex, consisting of several residential units and cottages, represents an extraordinary prototype of the "villa of delight", linked to the Visconti rediscovery of the humanistic ideal of the countryside. The Torretta construction site began around 1384, when Gian Galeazzo Visconti acquired a mill and other existing assets near the tower from the Astolfi (an aristocratic family from Pavia) and we have news of new interventions between 1388 and 1389. The Torretta had a large garden, reserved for the lord and enclosed by a brick wall: in 1389 over 191,000 bricks were transported for the construction of the walls. In the garden of the Torretta, where Gian Galeazzo had taken refuge for fear of the plague, the duke received the Sienese ambassadors in 1399 and very often the lord retired to the Torretta (which we could define as a sort of park within the park) in search of quiet and relaxation.

=== Mirabello Castle ===
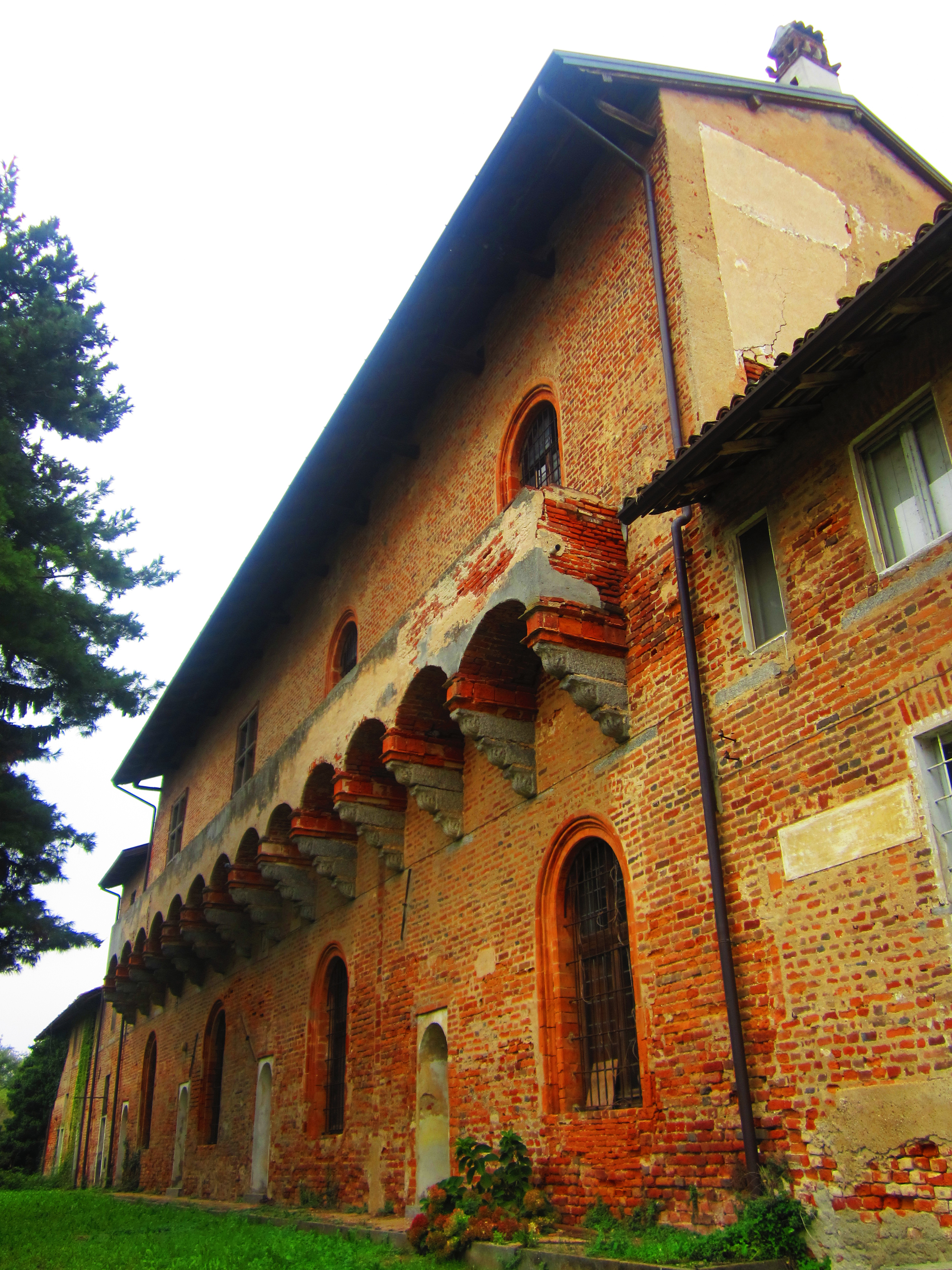
Mirabello Castle

In 1325 the rich Fiamberti family from Pavia acquired numerous assets and funds in the area and, between 1325 and 1341, had the primitive castle built, with a tower and shelter. In the 1360s, Galeazzo II Visconti bought half of the castle from the Fiamberti family, with the relevant funds, while the remaining part of the complex was expropriated by the lord. The complex was restored by Gian Galeazzo Visconti in 1384 and included in the large Visconti Park. Filippo Maria Visconti established the position of captain of the Park, in charge of the custody and management of the ducal assets and placed his seat in the castle. In 1472 Galeazzo Maria Sforza had the building renovated and enlarged, which was used several times by the dukes as a seat of political representation, on the occasion of hunts and banquets organized within the park. Probably around 1491, Gian Galeazzo Sforza donated the castle to Galeazzo Sanseverino who had the residence renovated. During the battle of Pavia in 1525 the castle hosted the king of France Francis I and in the same battle Galeazzo Sanseverino died fighting in the French ranks.

=== The settlements and fortified farms ===
Inside the park there were also three communities (San Genesio, Torre del Mangano and Borgarello) existing at least since the twelfth century. Some of them were equipped with castles and fortified farms that were bought or occupied by the Visconti. In San Genesio there was, at least since 1326, a castle owned by the Sisti family from Pavia, which was expropriated by Galeazzo II and demolished to enlarge the park. In place of it, the lord had a farm built with four towers. Not otherwise, in Torre del Mangano there was already a tower controlled by the Del Mangano family from Pavia since 1302, which, in 1328, perhaps because it was strengthened, became a castle; it was later sold by Gian Galeazzo to the monks of the Certosa. A castle, albeit in ruins, was purchased by Gian Galeazzo himself in 1394 in Cornaliano dai Meriggi: in the document, next to the sediments on the castle stood, there were others where a “rocchetta”, rural buildings and some towers had been built. Much more limited must have been the works in defense of the Torre del Gallo, sold by the Astolfi to Bianca of Savoy in 1388: a tower; it was therefore in this case a simple fortified farm.

== Disuse and decay ==
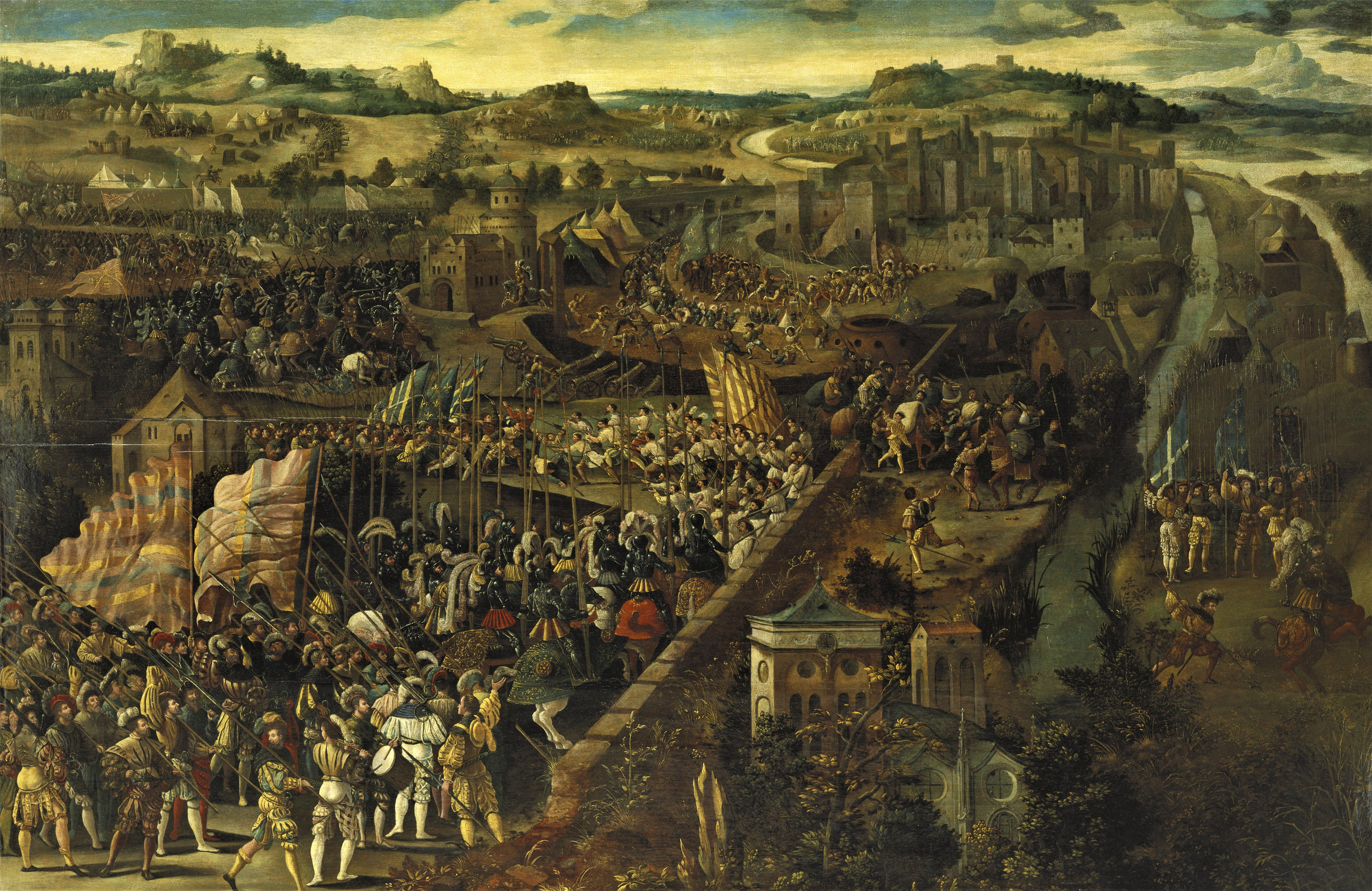
The breaching of the walls of the Visconti Park is a recurrent theme in the iconography of the Battle of Pavia (unknown Flemish artist, 16th century)

After the rule of Ludovico Maria Sforza (1489-1494) the park was progressively abandoned and its features deteriorated. In 1525 it was the theater of the Battle of Pavia fought between French and Imperial–Spanish forces. The walls of the park were damaged by the armies while manoeuvring during the battle. In the following centuries the masonry of the wall, offering bricks for the reuse in the nearby peasant houses, went through a general demise up to its complete demolition.

== The area of the park nowadays ==
The Visconti Park area today has few signs of its ancient function and is mainly dedicated to agriculture, like the area external to it. Of the Mirabello Castle, having originally a quadrilateral layout, only one side has survived. The Torretta complex, transformed into a farm in the 16th century, is also partly preserved. Remains of two gates are visible at Torre del Mangano and in San Genesio (Porta Pescarina). The other gates survive only in place names.

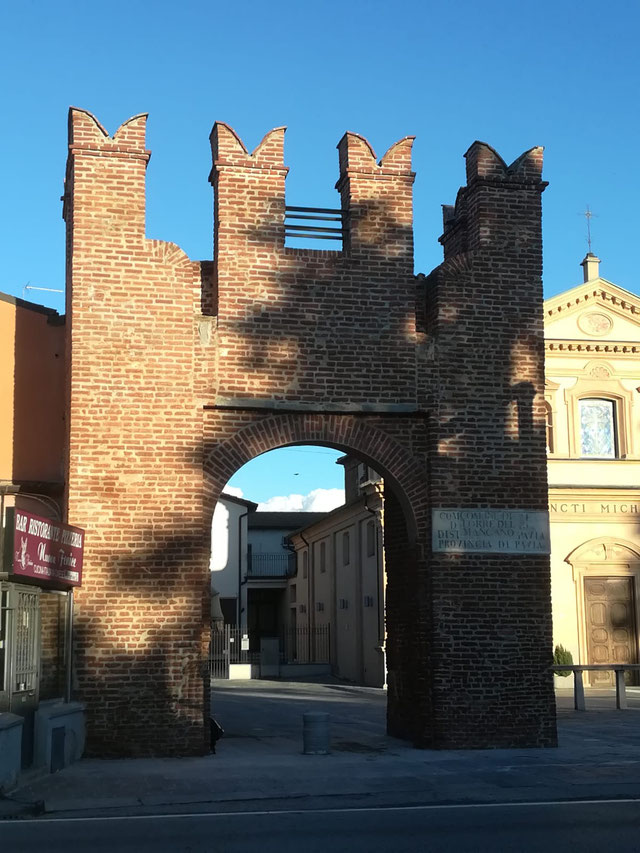
One of the surviving gates of the park in Torre del Mangano near the Charterhouse.

Much of the area once occupied by the park is now agricultural land, however three naturalistic areas have remained that can fully be considered heirs of the great hunting reserve of the lords of Milan: the Vernavola Park, the Heronry della Carola and the Heronry of Porta Chiossa, which extend over an area of almost 148 hectares (corresponding to approximately 365 acres).

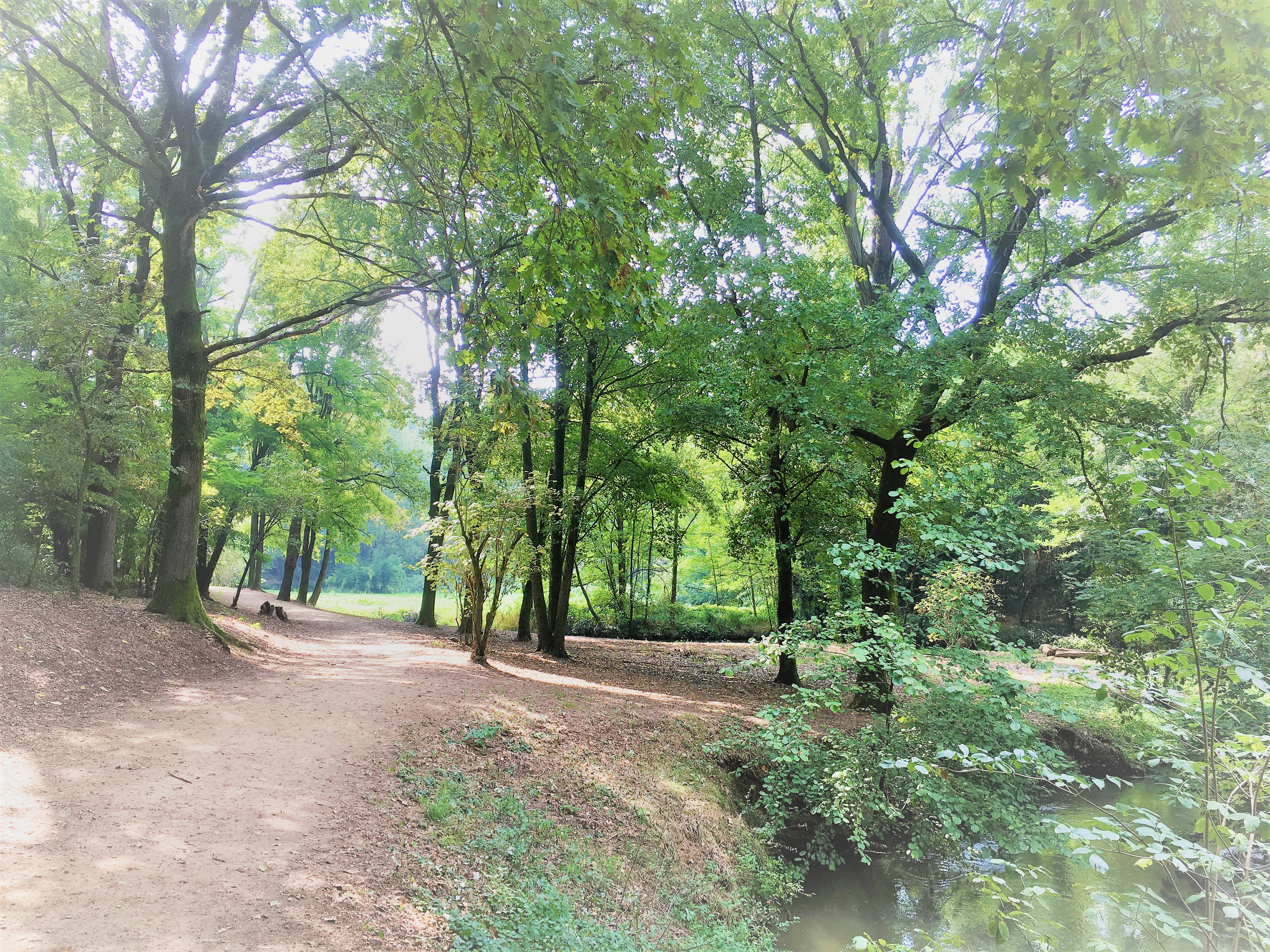
Vernavola Park

To facilitate the visit of the park, bike routes and thematical tours are proposed by local authorities.
