= Visconti Castle (Pavia) =

Medieval castle in Pavia, Lombardy, Italy

Visconti Castle of Pavia
- Castello Visconteo di Pavia
- Pavia, Lombardy, Northern Italy
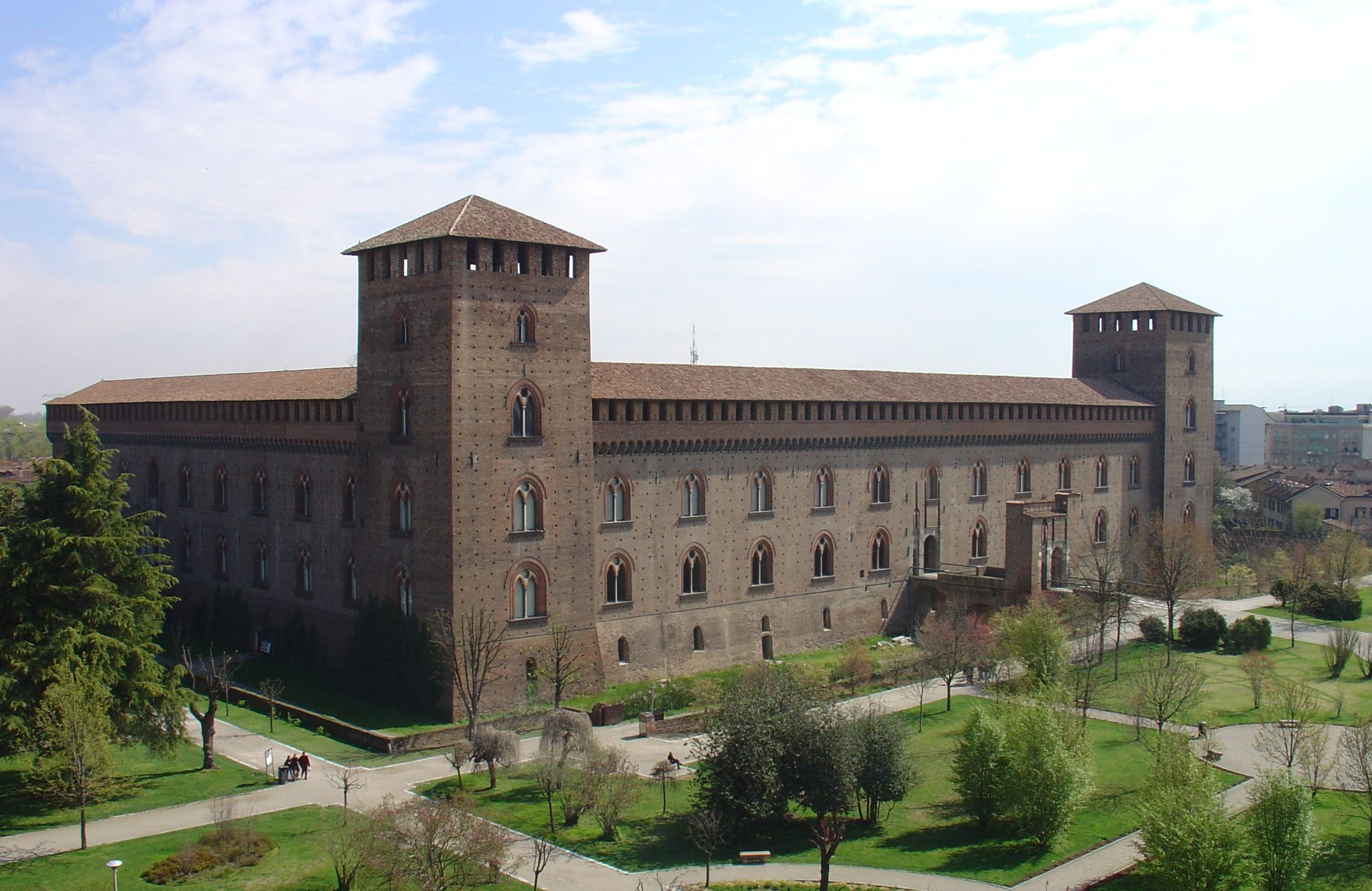
- The south-western side of the Visconti Castle with the main entrance and the two surviving towers

Site information
- Type: Medieval castle
- Owner: Municipality of Pavia
- Open to the public: Yes
- Condition: Good (the survived part, excluding two towers and one side destroyed in 1527)

Location
- Coordinates: 45°11′24″N 9°09′30″E
- Height: 43 metres (141 ft) (4 towers)
- Length: 142 metres (466 ft) (4 sides)

Site history
- Built: 1360–1365
- Built by: Galeazzo II Visconti
- Materials: Bricks (walls) and stone (columns)
- Battles/wars: Pavia (1525, Italian War of 1521–1526), Sack of Pavia (1527, War of the League of Cognac)

The Visconti Castle of Pavia (Italian: Castello Visconteo di Pavia) is a medieval castle in Pavia, Lombardy, Northern Italy. It was built after 1360 in a few years by Galeazzo II Visconti, Lord of Milan, and used as a sovereign residence by him and his son Gian Galeazzo, first duke of Milan. Its wide dimensions induced Petrarch, who visited Pavia in the fall of 1365, to call it "an enormous palace in the citadel, a truly remarkable and costly structure". Adjacent to the castle, the Visconti created a vast walled park that reached the Certosa di Pavia, a Carthusian monastery founded in 1396 by the Visconti as well and located about 7 kilometres (4.3 mi) to the north.

In the 16th century, an artillery attack on Pavia destroyed a wing and two towers of the castle. The frescos that entirely decorated the castle rooms are today almost completely lost. The castle had been the seat of the Visconti Library until its transfer to Paris in 1499. Today, it hosts the Pavia Civic Museums.

== History ==
=== Visconti-Sforza period (1360–1535) ===
==== Galeazzo II Visconti and his son Gian Galeazzo (14th century) ====
In 1359 the Visconti of Milan conquered Pavia. The city became part of the western portion of the Visconti territories, ruled by Galeazzo II Visconti. His idea to build a castle came from Pavia's ancient role as the capital of the Lombard Kingdom and the Visconti's ambition to extend their dominion to its territory. He chose the site of the castle in the most elevated part of Pavia, in the direction of Milan. There, he created a citadel, isolated by a moat from the rest of the city. The castle occupied the eastern portion of the citadel.

The castle was conceived as a residential palace to host the sovereign court, the chancellery, and the ruler's family. The military functions were concentrated in the Citadel outside the castle. The construction began in 1360 and was completed in about five years. The castle extended over a square surface with 142-meter-long sides. Internally, the four sides had a series of eleven square rooms, elevated on two floors. Each room received light through a single mullioned window overlooking the moat. Four square towers, 43-meter high, were erected at the corners of the castle. Mullioned windows were opened on the four tower's floor.

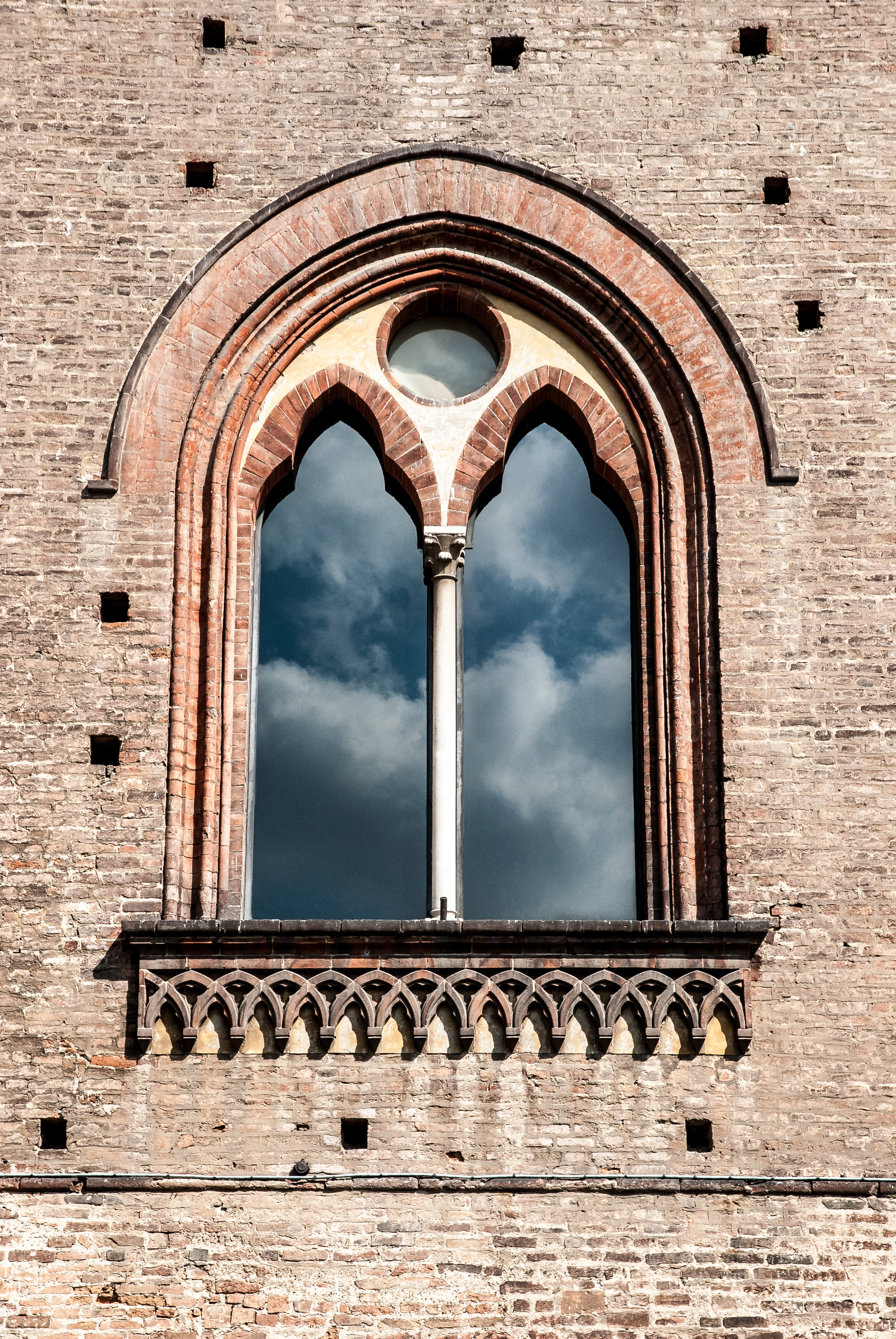
External mullioned window

The four sides faced the courtyard internally with a portico on the ground floor and a loggiato, open through four-light windows, on the first floor. Crenelated roofs covered the wings and the towers.

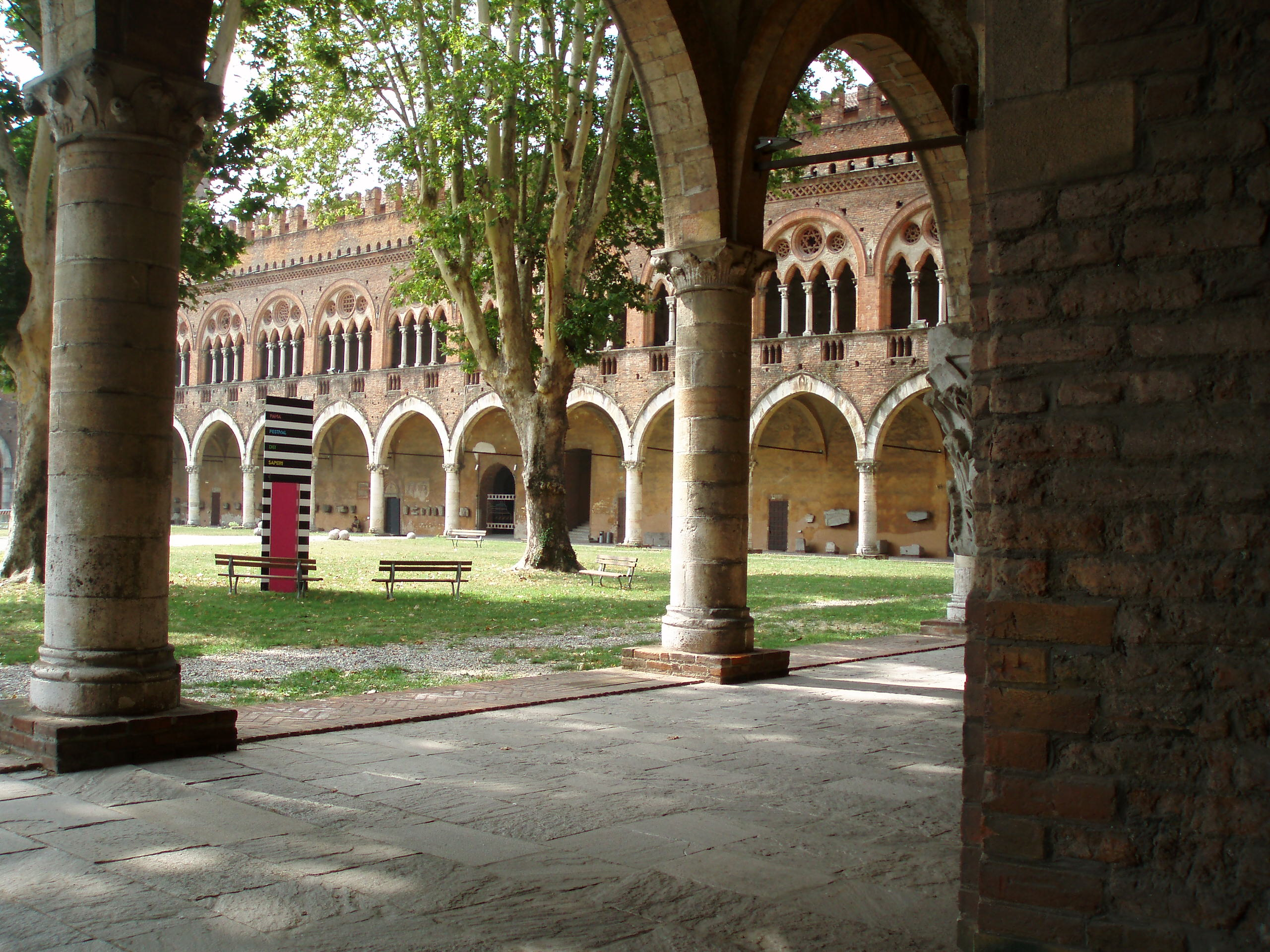
The portico on the ground floor

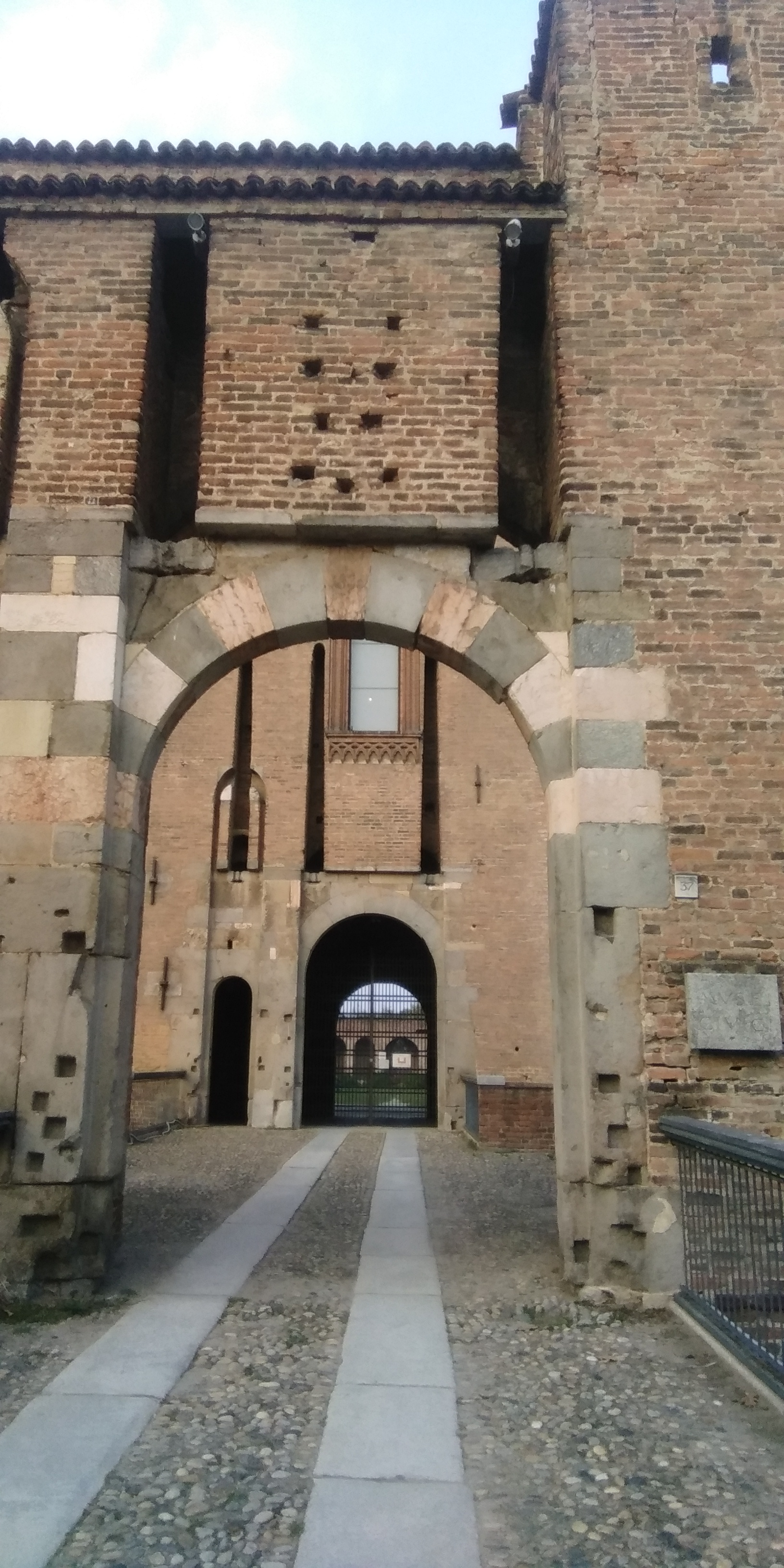
Main entrance to the castle

The architect of the castle is unknown. Some details, such as the internal square module and the four-light windows, have tentatively identified the Venetian architect Bernardo da Venezia, who was nevertheless active in Pavia only after 1389.

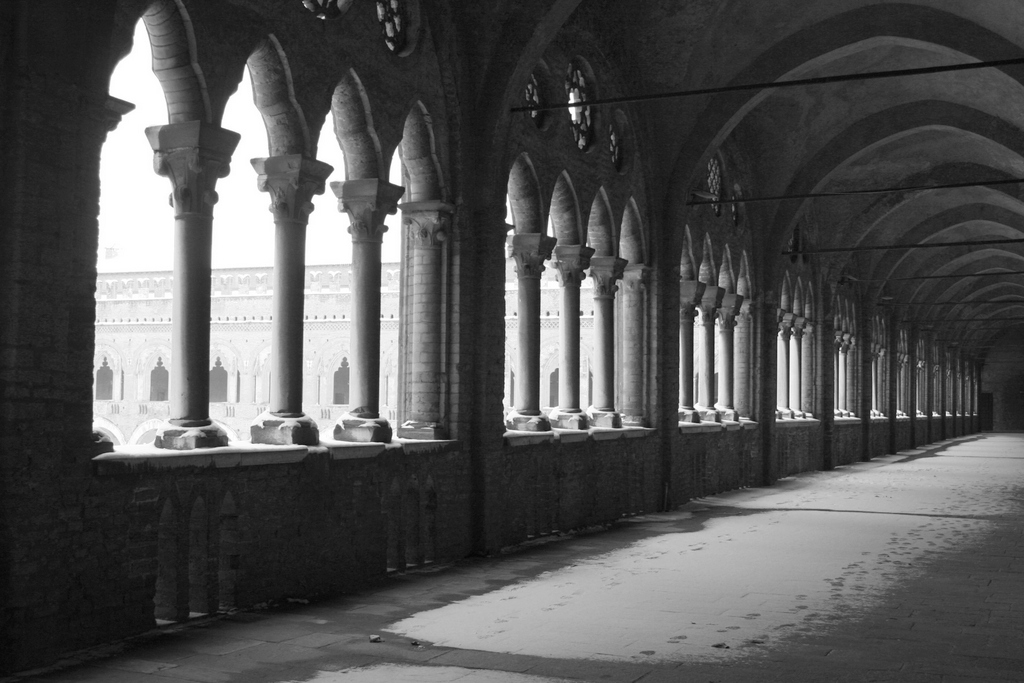
Winter view of the loggiato on the first floor of the south-western side with the four-light windows

After completing the castle, under Gian Galeazzo's rule, the loggiato of the first floor was modified to make it more liveable. On the north-western and south-eastern sides, the four-light windows were reduced respectively to single-light and mullioned windows. The Visconti made a great effort to decorate all the castle's rooms with frescoes. Since local painters were not enough, Galeazzo II and his son requested the Gonzaga, rulers of Mantua, to send to Pavia all the painters available there on a couple of occasions. The north-eastern side hosted the seigneurial apartments, the richest in decoration. The Sala grande dele caze (Great Hunting Hall) occupied three square modules on the first floor and was the most prominent room in the castle. Faced to the Visconti Park, it was entirely frescoed with hunting scenes and used by the Lord's family as their dining room. A great impact to the visitors had the Camera delli spechi (Room of the Mirrors), a room on the ground floor with the vault and the walls covered with small, decorated glasses that reflected the light of the sun.

The Visconti Park.

In 1385, Gian Galeazzo Visconti ousted his uncle Bernabò and became the sole ruler of Milan and the Visconti territories. He continued altogether to reside in Pavia. He directed frequent military campaigns against the nearby local powers from the castle, making Pavia the capital of a continuously increasing territory.

The western tower hosted the Visconti Library, a vast collection of books gathered by Galeazzo II and expanded by his son. After the Visconti's conquest of Padua, the library received several books that belonged to Petrarch. Geoffrey Chaucer is supposed to have visited the Visconti Library in 1378.

==== From Filippo Maria Visconti to Ludovico il Moro (15th century) ====
After the death of Gian Galeazzo in 1402, Pavia lost importance to Milan as the capital of the Visconti dominions. The Visconti continued, nevertheless, to decorate the castle. Pisanello worked in Milan in 1440, and Filippo Maria Visconti (the son and successor of Gian Galeazzo) asked him to paint the great fresco later attested in one of the castle's rooms.

Francesco Sforza, Duke of Milan since 1450, arranged to preserve the decorations. In 1457 he called Bonifacio Bembo to restore the Great Hunting Hall. Before the Galeazzo Maria Sforza's marriage to Bona of Savoy in 1468, Bembo was again called in Pavia to renew the existing frescoes.

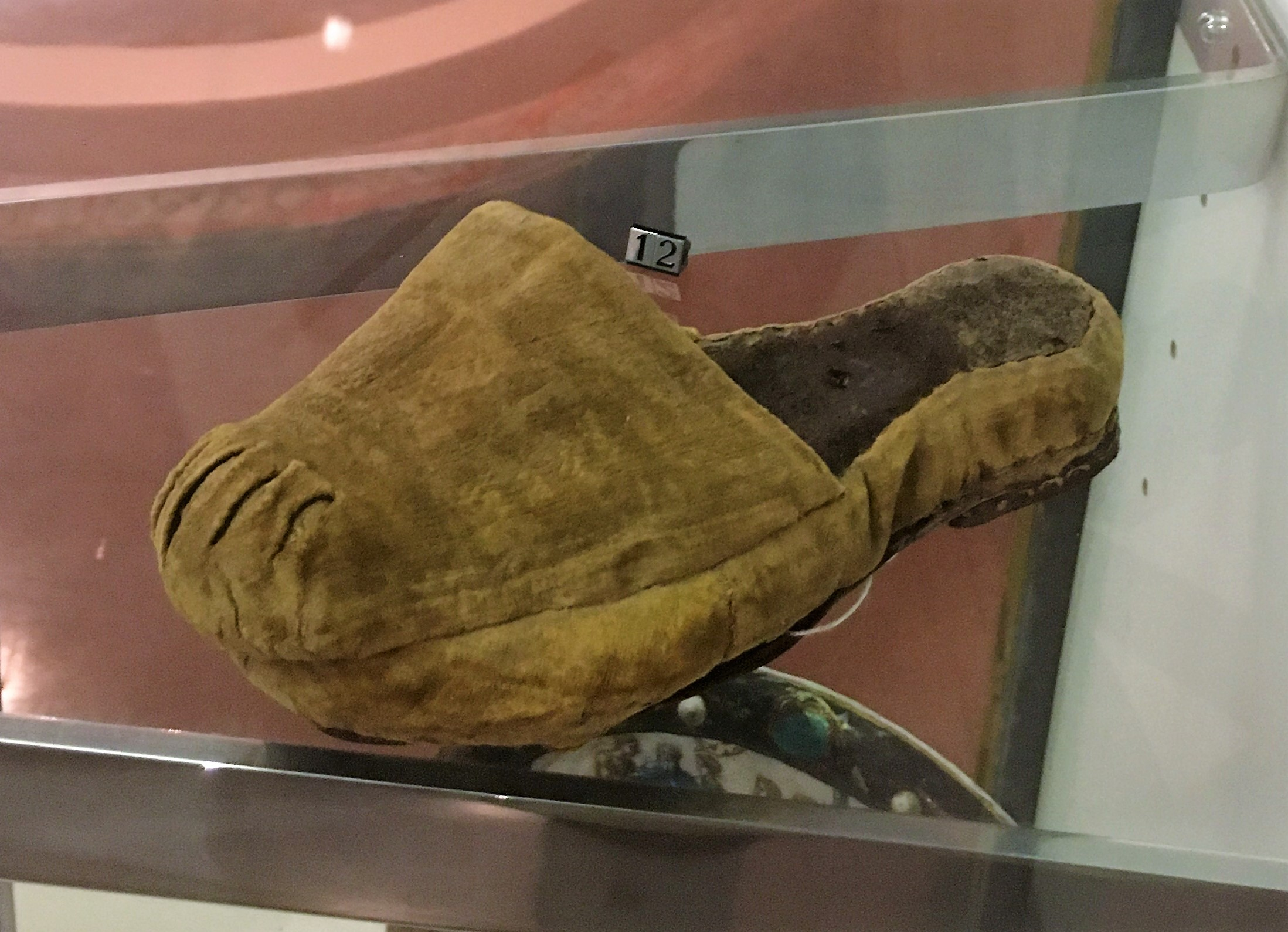
Women's velvet slipper, found in the castle during the 1955 restorations, second half of the 15th century, Pavia Civic Museums

On 17 January 1491, in the ducal chapel of the castle, Ludovico il Moro married Beatrice d'Este, daughter of Ercole I d'Este, Duke of Ferrara. In the same year Ludovico il Moro had Gian Galeazzo Sforza and his wife Isabella of Aragon transferred to the castle, who lived here until 1495, the year of the suspected death of Gian Galeazzo Sforza, and where they created a brilliant court.

==== Damages inflicted during the Italian Wars (16th century) ====
Since the end of the 15th century, the Duchy of Milan was at the center of the conflict between France and the Holy Roman Empire. The ensuing frequent wars caused damages to the Pavia castle and the Visconti Park.

In 1498, Louis of Orleans, a grandson of Valentina Visconti (daughter of Gian Galeazzo and Isabel of Valois), became King of France as Louis XII. The following year, claiming hereditary rights against the Sforza house, he invaded the Duchy of Milan and occupied Pavia. During the French rule, about half of the books of the Visconti Library were transferred to Paris.

In 1512, after the Battle of Ravenna, the French retired from Pavia, and the Sforza returned to power. Francis I, the successor of Louis XII and Valentina Visconti's descendant, defeated the Sforza in the Battle of Marignano in 1515 and conquered Milan and Pavia again. The French encountered the opposition of the emperor Charles V, who defended the imperial role as the grantor of the Duke of Milan title. The Battle of Pavia in 1525 ended a new war with the defeat of France and the imprisonment of Francis I. The battle significantly damaged the walls of the Visconti Park, causing the beginning of its decay.

After the release of Francis I, the French attacked Pavia again in the War of the League of Cognac. Odet de Foix, Viscount of Lautrec, sieged the castle in 1527. The French artillery destroyed the north-eastern side with the two adjacent towers. The most prominent part of the castle, the richly decorated seigneurial apartments, went therefore lost. The war ended again with the defeat of France. Pavia and the Duchy of Milan definitively returned to the Holy Roman Empire. The members of the Sforza house were reinstated as dukes of Milan and rulers of Pavia.

In 1535, after the death without heirs of Francesco II, the last Sforza Duke, Charles V assumed the direct rule of Pavia. After him, Pavia remained under the power of his successors, members of the Habsburg house.

=== Spanish and Austrian periods (1535–1796) ===
Pavia and its castle followed the destiny of the other Habsburg possessions in Lombardy, initially as part of the Spanish Kingdom and then, after the War of the Spanish Succession, under the Austrian rule. The Spanish regime built the new city walls along a border that included the destroyed north-eastern side of the castle. A bastion of the walls occupied that area. Since then, the Spanish Walls separated the Visconti Park from the castle.

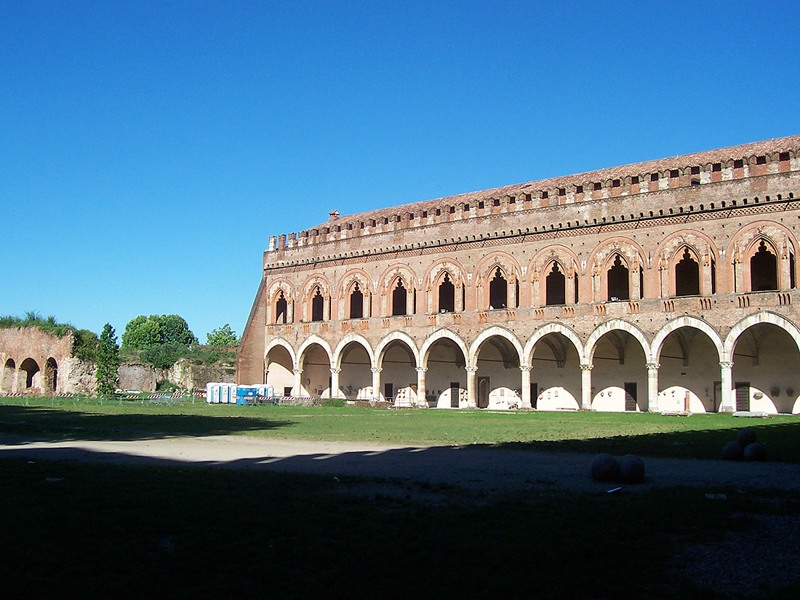
The truncated south-eastern side; to the left, the remains of the Spanish Walls are visible where once stood the north-eastern side destroyed in 1527

=== Barrack for the French, Austrian, and Italian armies (1796–1920) ===
The Napoleonic forces occupied Pavia in 1796 during the first Italian campaign. The French army transformed the castle into a barrack. To protect it from the artillery attacks, they covered the roof with earth, causing infiltrations and humidity that damaged the building. In the Napoleonic era the foundry was reopened and enlarged and the castle became the artillery arsenal of the Kingdom of Italy, a function it maintained until 1814, when the foundry was definitively closed. The Austrians, after their return in 1815, continued to use the castle as a barrack. After the Italian unification in 1859–1860, the castle passed to the Italian army. It housed a body of 1200 men and 600 horses. The prolonged military use of the castle was the primary cause of the deterioration of the frescoes that decorated its rooms.

In the second half of the 19th century, the Pavia-Cremona railway was built. Following the line along the ditch of the Spanish Walls, it passed underneath through two of their bastions.

=== Restoration of the 20th century ===
The military use ceased in 1920. Restorations and transformations adapted the castle to public service and ended in the '40s. The restoration preserved the castle's existing forms. Two mullioned windows of the south-eastern wing were modified and restored to their original 14-century four-light version.

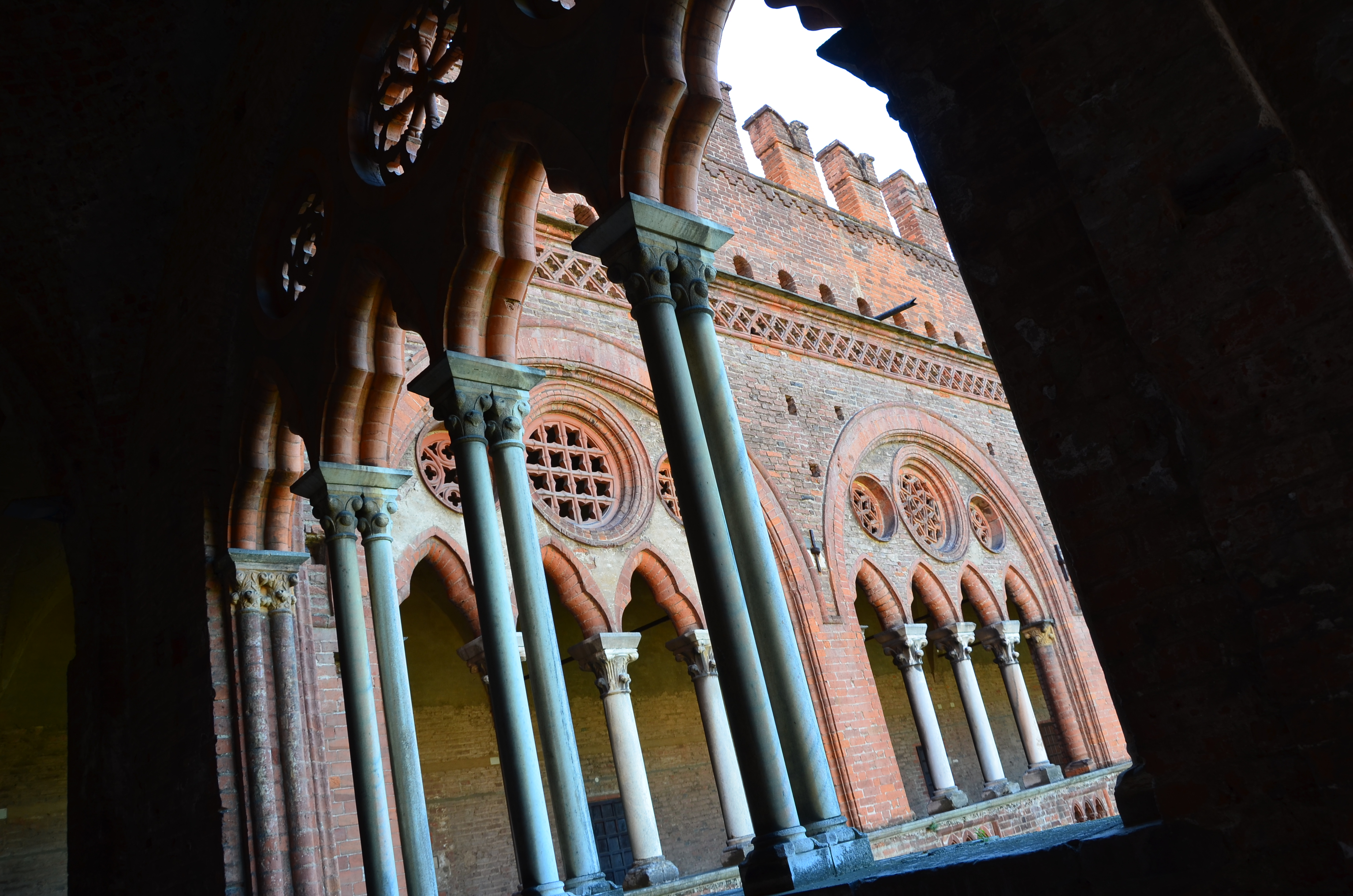
One of the two four-light windows of the south-eastern loggia restored to its original shape; on the background, the four-light windows of the south-western side

== Today ==
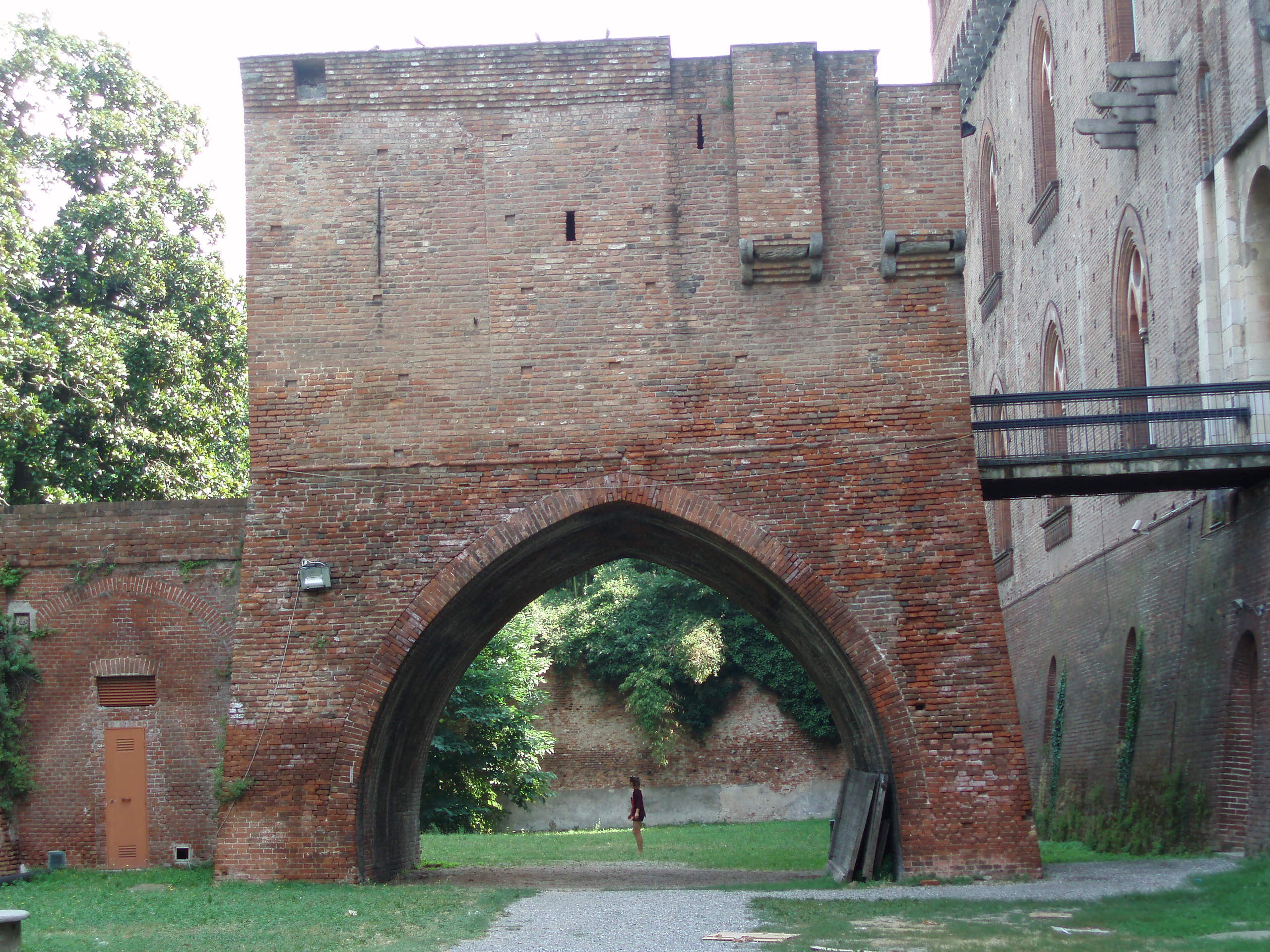
The ravelin of the north-western side with the entrance to the Pavia Civic Museums

The castle hosts the Civic Museums of Pavia (Musei civici di Pavia). They include the Pinacoteca Malaspina, Museo Archeologico and Sala Longobarda, Sezioni Medioevale e Rinascimentale, Quadreria dell’800 (Collezione Morone), Museo del Risorgimento, Museo Robecchi Bricchetti, and the Crypt of Sant’Eusebio. In the western tower, where once stood the Visconti Library, a virtual reconstruction allows the consultation of the books once kept there. The rooms with the survived frescos and decorations can be visited as part of the museums' tour.

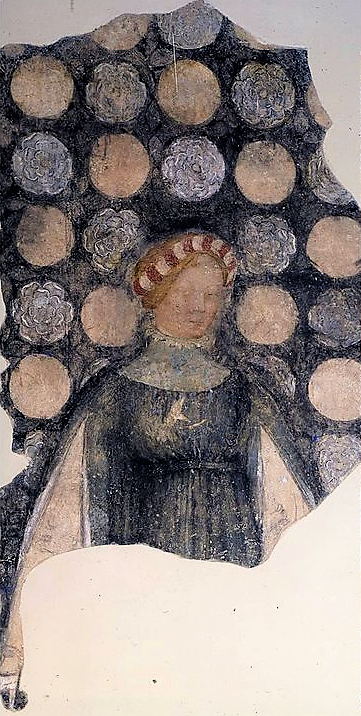
Gentile da Fabriano, Damsel, 1393.

In the portico on the ground floor there are traces of the first pictorial decoration with geometric figures, while on the vaults the starry sky was painted, ordered by Galeazzo II for the whole castle in 1366. The geometric painting, however, had to leave room, in the walls, also to figurative scenes. The remains of frescoes, depicting the View of Pavia (south wing, third span) and Knights (west wing, sixth and eighth spans) dating back to the seventh decade of the fourteenth century and recently attributed to Giusto de 'Menabuoi. Some doors open onto the portico still retain the inscription in Gothic characters which identified the entrance to rooms used as offices, including the one intended for the accountancy of the Duchess Caterina Visconti. On the ground floor of the south-west tower is the "blue room", the result of the pictorial interventions of 1469, particularly sumptuous for the preciousness of the techniques and materials used. The decoration is made up of squares with raised and gilded frames, which divide the walls, always in relief and covered with gold foils are the heraldic motifs (lilies of France and Sforza emblems) and stars, on alternately blue and green backgrounds. On the ground floor, immediately to the right of the southern entrance, there is the chapel, with a rectangular plan and rib vaults, on the portal of the chapel there is a sinopia depicting the Pietà, by Michelino da Besozzo, while inside there are frescoes, such as Geometry or The Blessing Christ, by Andrea da Bologna.

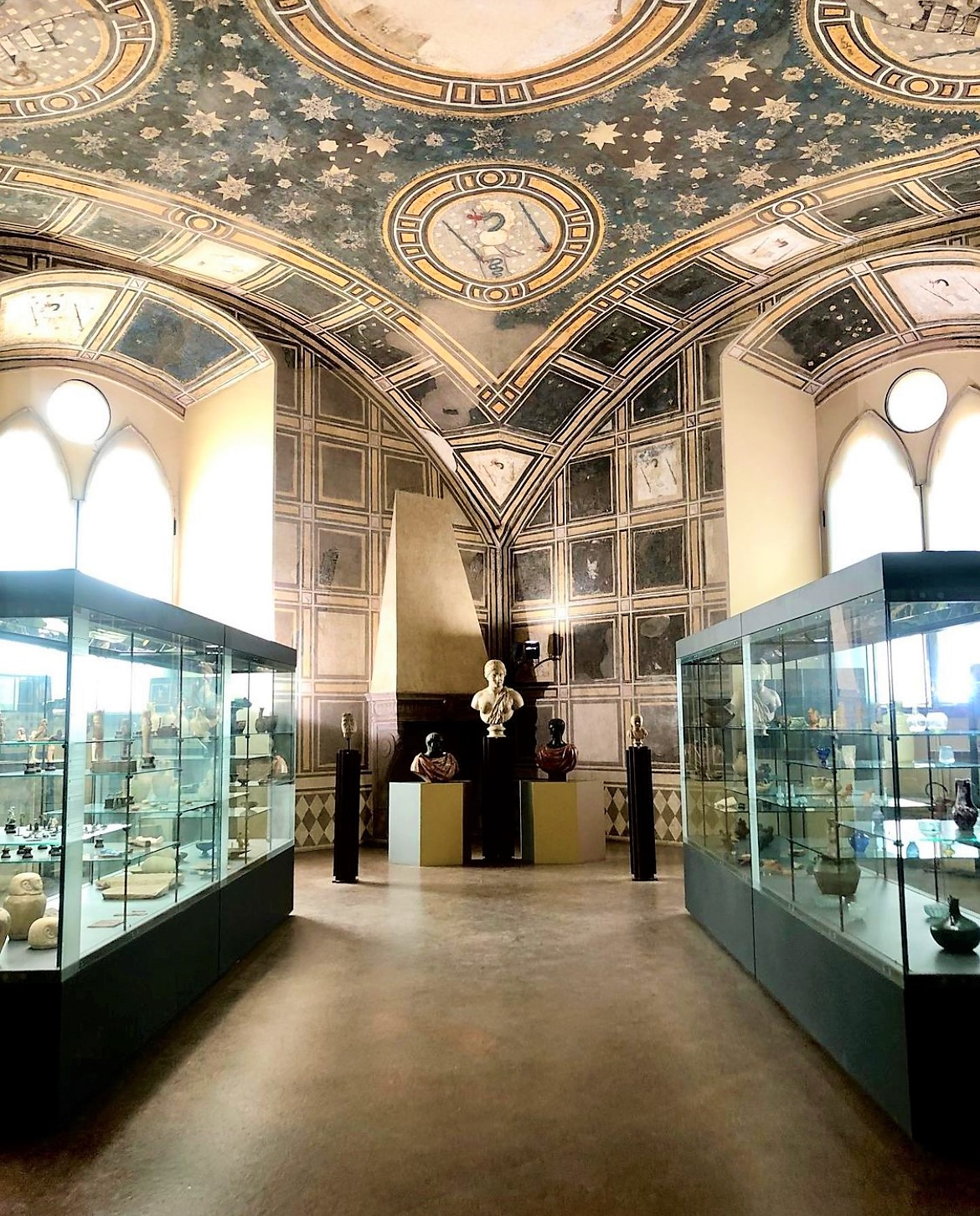
The blue room

Also in the chapel, the two Saints Stephen and Leonard, painted within the squares, facing each other, on the piers of the arch that divides the room into two bays, were executed at a later time, however in the last quarter of the Three hundred, and are the work of a Lombard master. Also on the ground floor is the "room of the doves" where on a reddish background the Visconti devince of the Colombina alternates with the motto "à bon droit", adopted by Gian Galeazzo, and that of the mountain with the three pine cones and the motto "mit Zeit ", these frescoes, like those in the" blue room ", date back to the interventions of 1469. On the first floor (the noble floor, where the ducal apartments were located, the library, in the tower at the southwest corner, and the chancellery, south-east tower, of which the inscription on the door is still preserved) there is the "room of the bridesmaids" where there are two frescoes, depicting life-size ladies in front of a hedge of roses dating back to the pictorial interventions promoted by Gian Galeazzo in 1393 and recently attributed to Gentile da Fabriano, who in those years worked in Pavia.

In the internal courtyard, on the side where a wing and two towers are missing for the 1527 artillery attack, the remains of the Spanish Walls are visible.
