= Siege of Pavia (773–774) =

Battle

Coordinates: 45°11′06″N 9°9′15″E

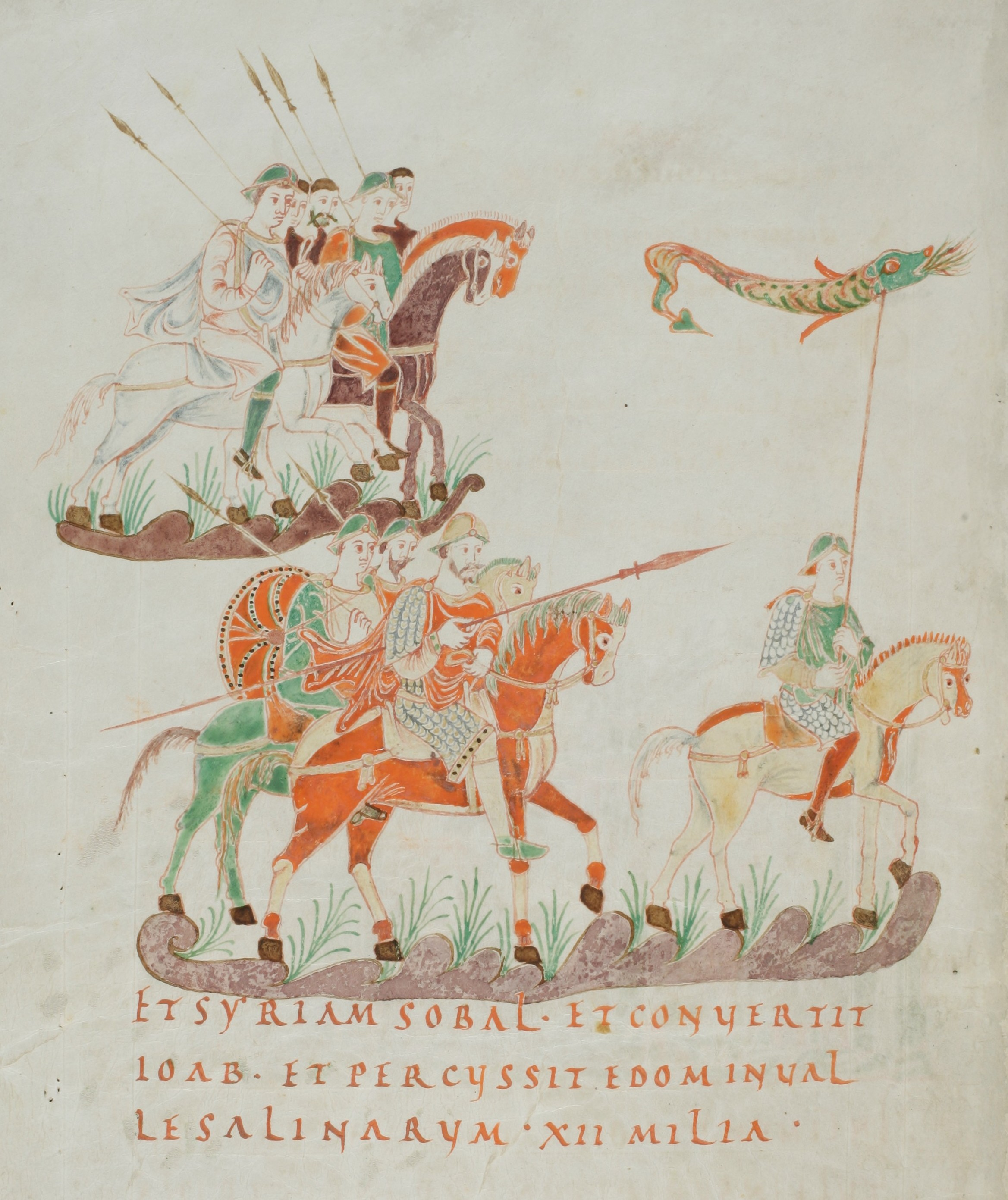
- Carolingian cavalry. Illustration of psalm 60 in the Golden Psalter of St. Gallen, c. 890.
Date	September 773 – 5 June 774
Location	Ticinum (modern Pavia), southwest of Milan
Result	Frankish Victory
Territorial changes	Frankish conquest of the Lombard Kingdom

Belligerents
Kingdom of the Franks	Kingdom of the Lombards

Commanders and leaders
Charlemagne; Bernard, son of Charles Martel	Desiderius

Strength
10,000–40,000	2,500–10,000

The siege or battle of Pavia was fought in 773–774 in northern Italy, near Ticinum (modern Pavia), and resulted in the victory of the Franks under Charlemagne against the Lombards under King Desiderius.

== Background ==
Charlemagne, rex Francorum, had succeeded to the throne in 768 jointly with his brother Carloman. At the time there was antagonism between not only the two ruling brothers, but between the king of the Lombards, Desiderius, and the papacy. In 772, Pope Hadrian I expelled all the Lombard officials from the papal curia. In response, Desiderius invaded papal territory, even taking Otriculum (modern Otricoli), just a day's march from Rome. Hadrian called Charlemagne for assistance.

Charles had produced an alliance with the Lombards by marrying one of Desiderius' daughters, Desiderata; within a year, however, he had changed his mind about the marriage and alliance, and divorced his wife, sending her back to her father. This was taken as an insult by the Lombards.

Upon the death of Carloman in 771, his own wife, Gerberge, fled the kingdom with her children for reasons now unclear (Einhard disingenuously protests that she spurned her husband's brother "for no reason at all") and sought refuge with Desiderius at Pavia. Desiderius now returned the insult to the Franks by giving her asylum, and protesting that her children be allowed their share of the Kingdom of the Franks. The relationship between Frank and Lombard now broke down completely and the pope took full advantage. His embassy landed at Marseille and travelled to Thionville, where they delivered this message:

They [the Lombards] would attack us [the pope] by land and water, conquer the city of Rome and lead ourselves into captivity. . . . Therefore we implore you by the living God and the Prince of the Apostles to hasten to our aid immediately, lest we be destroyed.

Charlemagne ascertained the truth of Desiderius' aggressions and the threat he posed to his own Frankish realm and marched his troops towards Italy in the early summer of 773.

== Triumph at Pavia ==
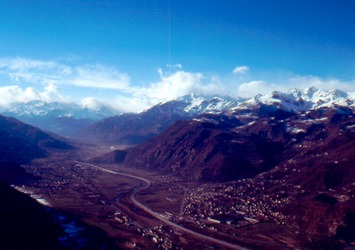
The pass at Susa Valley

Charles' army had 10,000–40,000 troops; he divided it in half, giving command of one half to his uncle, Bernard, son of Charles Martel, and led it through the Alpine passes; he through that of the Dora Susa near Mont Cenis, and Bernard through the Great St Bernard Pass. At the foot of the mountains, Charles' army met the fortifications of Desiderius, but scouting forces found an alternate route. A cavalcade was sent to attack the defenders from the flank and, with Bernard's forces approaching from the east, the Lombards fled to fortified Pavia. The Frankish troops then marched on to begin the siege of Pavia by September.

The Frankish army, while often using cavalry in campaigns, also adopted attrition siege tactics with rudimentary engines likely planning for prolonged encirclement through vallation and contra-vallation to this heavily fortified position. The Lombards, blocked from resupply and the countryside in the hands of the Franks, suffered starvation and disease. Desiderius remained in Pavia, but Adelchis, his son, had left to stronger Verona to guard over the family of Carloman. Charles led a small force to besiege Verona. Adelchis fled in fear to Constantinople, and the city and Carloman's family were taken.

Charles then began to subdue the whole region around Pavia in the early months of 774. Charles even visited the pope in Rome at Easter. No other Lombard dukes or counts made any attempt at relief and Desiderius made no strong counterattack. In the tenth month of the siege, famine was hitting Pavia hard and Desiderius, realising that he was left on his own, opened the gates to Charles and surrendered on some Tuesday in June.

== Legacy ==
After the victory, Charlemagne had himself declared rex Langobardorum, and from that time onwards he was to be called "King of the Franks and Lombards". This was unique in the history of the Germanic kingdoms of the Early Middle Ages: a current ruler taking the title of the conquered for his own. Charles was forging what could in modern language be called an "empire" proper; he was also allying himself very closely with the Church as its protector. His recognition of temporal Papal authority in central Italy helped lay the foundation for medieval Papal power.

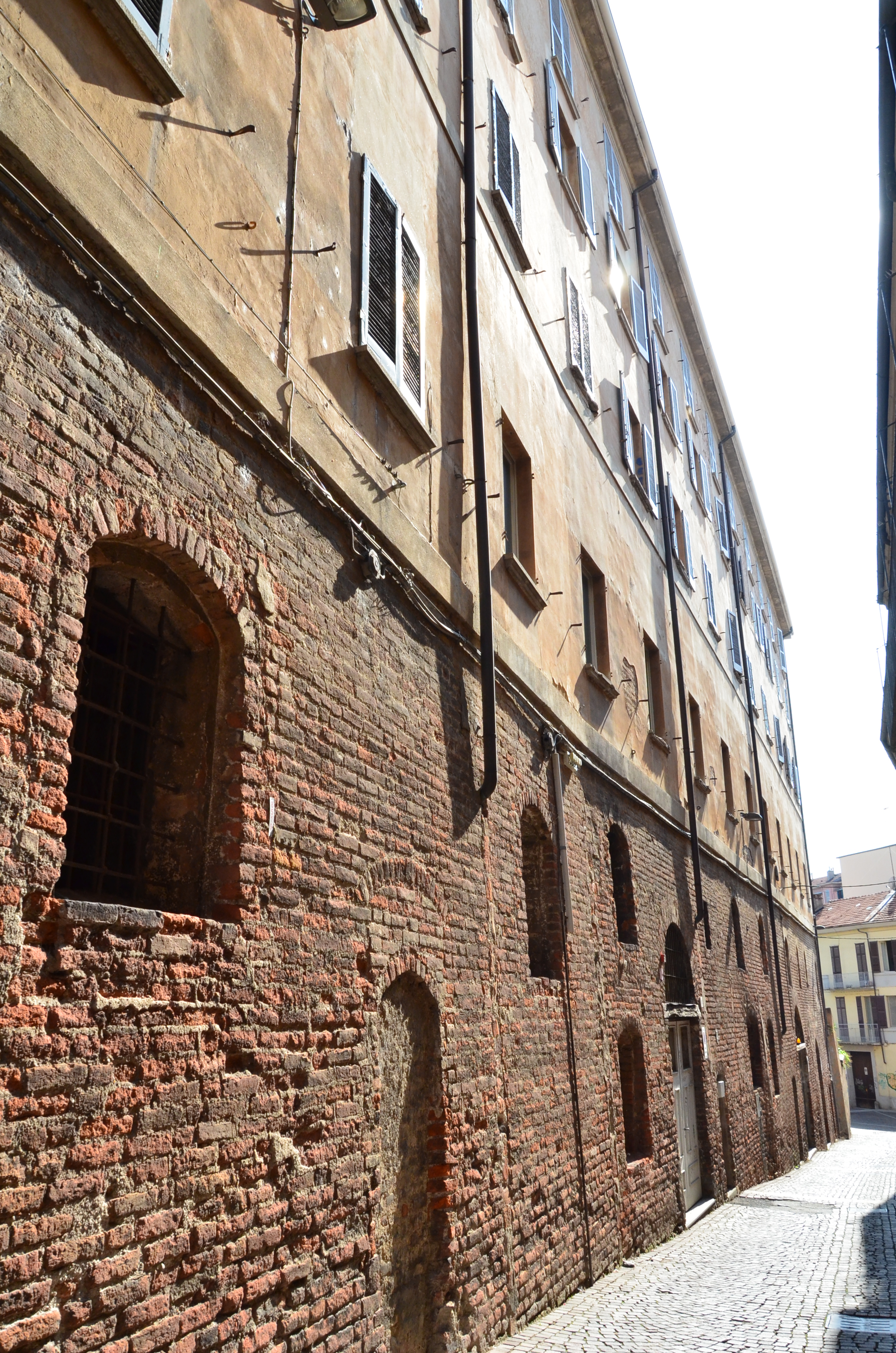
Pavia, via dei Mulini, part of the ancient Roman and early medieval walls inserted inside houses.

The decline of the Lombard state had been swift, and the changes wrought in Italy by the Frankish conquest were great. Many Franks entered into positions of power and authority in Italy, though many Lombards, on account of their willingness to make peace with Charles, retained their positions.

As Paul K. Davis writes, "The defeat and consequent destruction of the Lombards monarchy rid Rome of its most persistent threat to Papal security, laying the groundwork for the Holy Roman Empire."

== Memories of the siege ==
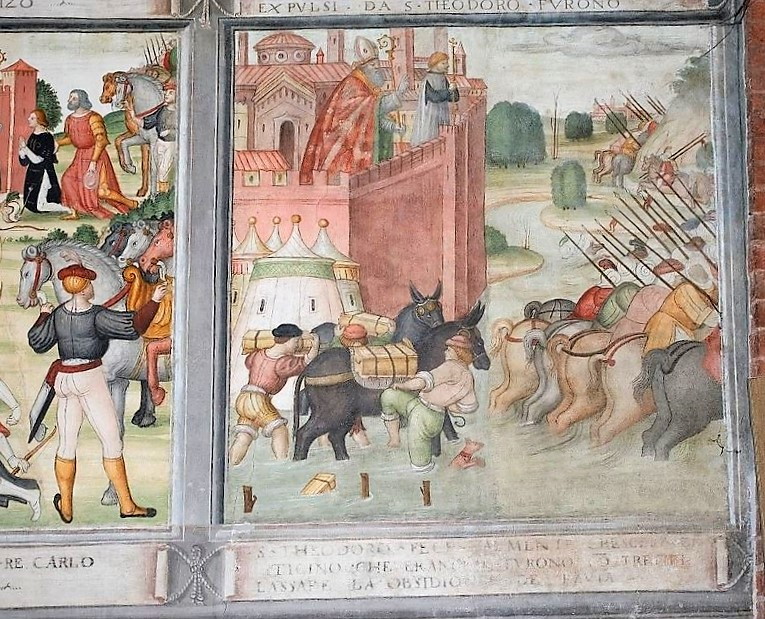
Anonymous Lombardo, Cycle of the stories of Saint Theodore of Pavia, Charlemagne is forced to abandon the siege of Pavia, about 1514, Pavia, Church San Teodoro.

In Pavia, where the memory of the Lombard reasoning and the role of capital of the city characterized the urban identity for centuries, there are some testimonies of the siege, some contemporary, such as the sections of the first walls preserved in via dei Mulini, others, albeit later, very significant, such as the cycle of the stories of Saint Theodore of Pavia frescoed in the right aisle of the church of San Teodoro.

The painting, commissioned in 1514 by the rector of the church Giovanni Luchino Corti to an anonymous Lombard artist, depicts some episodes in the life of the holy bishop of Pavia and in particular during the siege of 773-774, which significantly fails in the pictorial cycle. Theodore in fact caused the Ticino waters to swell, flooding the Frankish camp and forcing Charlemagne to abandon the siege. In years in which the wars of Italy created strong uncertainties about the future of the city and of the entire duchy of Milan, the clients, by modifying the real outcome of the siege, intended to underline their strong identity and autonomy, as if the Lombard kingdom had not ever really fallen.

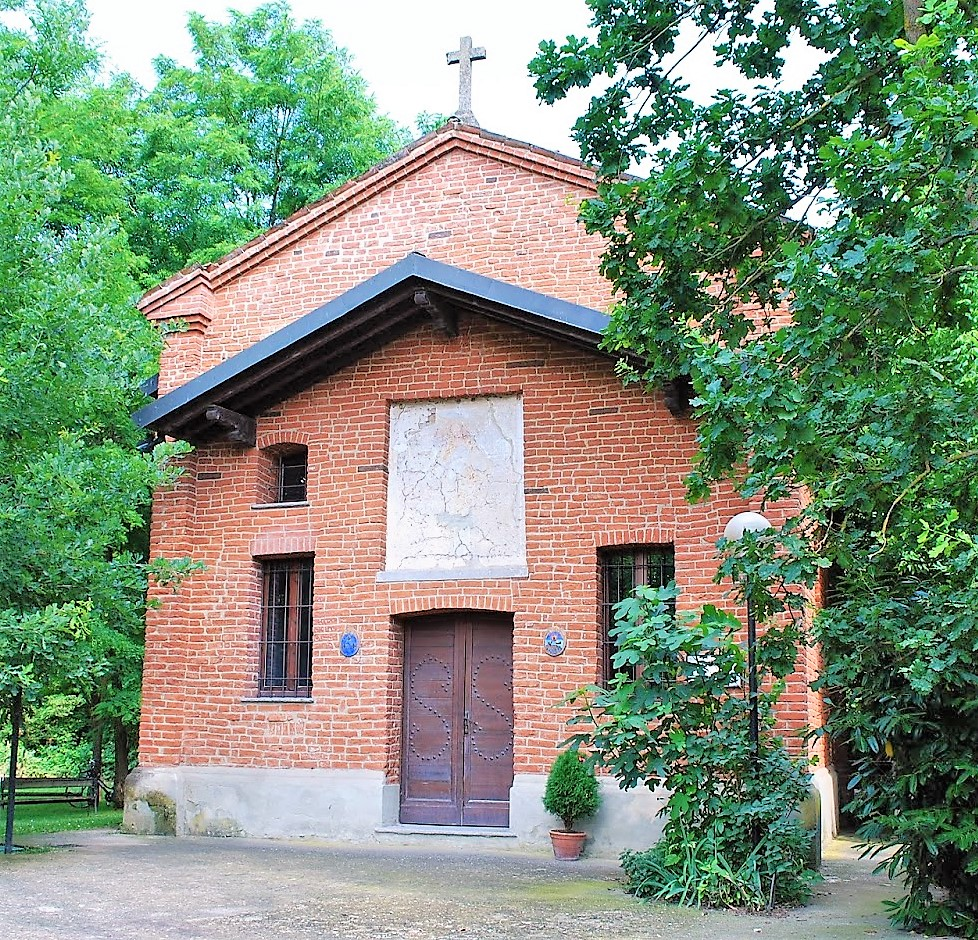
The church of Santa Sofia (Torre d'Isola)

Always linked to the memory of the siege is the small church of Santa Sofia (Torre d'Isola) located on a high terrace of Ticino a few kilometers west of the city, which according to a legend (based on the story handed down by the chronicler Notker the Stammerer) was built by Charlemagne during the siege of Pavia in just one day in order to better attend the divine services. However, beyond the imaginative narration of the chronicler, a royal residence certainly arose in the church in the ninth century, in which Louis II of Italy and then Charles the Bald stayed first in the year 876.

== Bibliography ==
- Bachrach, B. (2013). Charlemagne's Early Campaigns (768–777): A Diplomatic and Military Analysis. Leiden: Brill Publishers. ISBN 978-90-04-22410-0.
