= Palazzo del Maino =

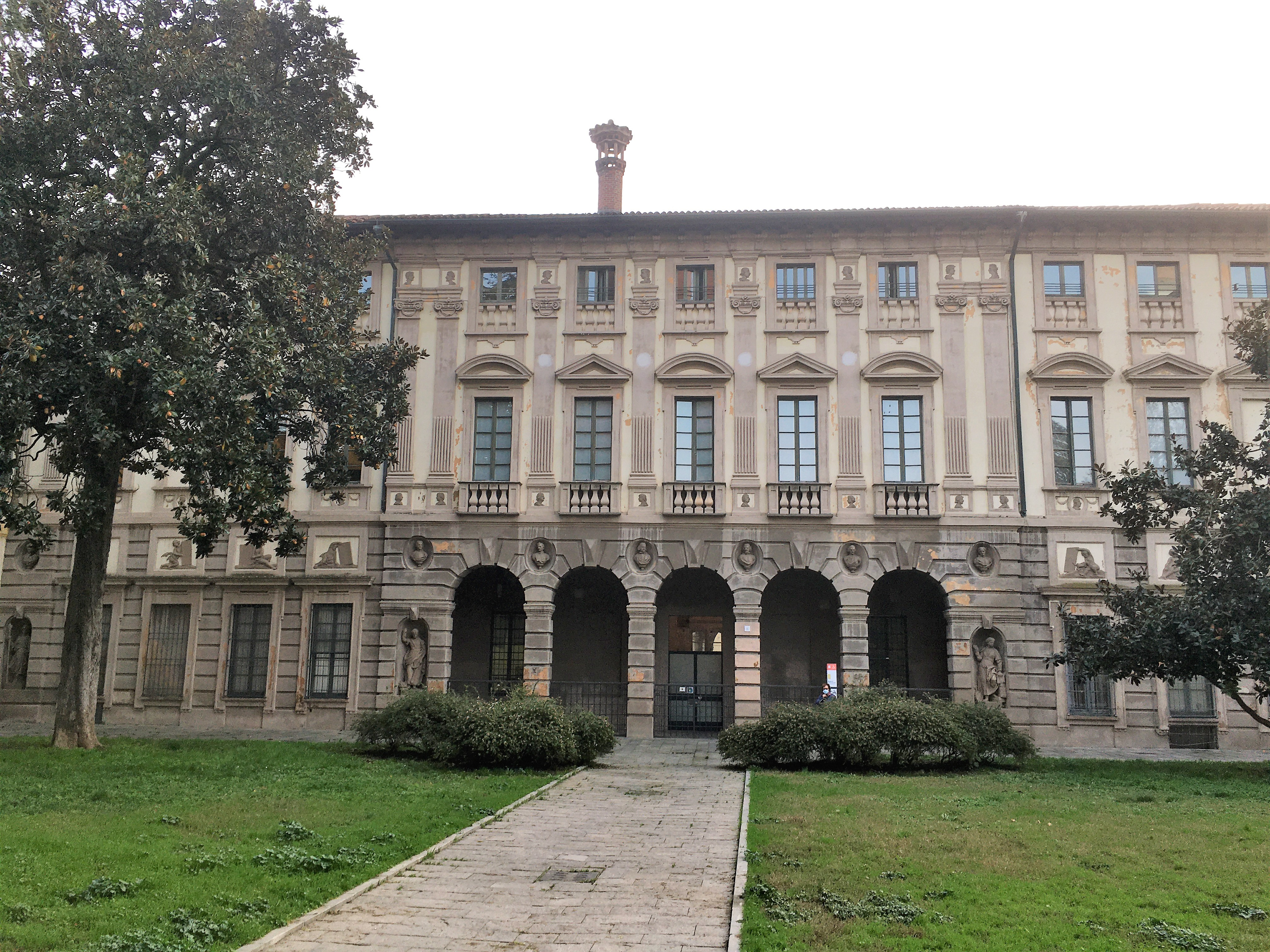
- The facade once facing the garden, now facing Piazza Leonardo da Vinci
- Interactive map of the Palazzo del Maino area

General information
- Type: Palace
- Architectural style: Baroque
- Location: Pavia, Italy
- Coordinates: 45°11′09″N 9°09′29″E
- Opened: 1725
- Owner: University of Pavia

Palazzo del Maino is a Baroque palace in Pavia, in Lombardy.

== History ==
In the area where the palace now stands, in the 15th century there was the palace of the nobleman Silvestro Bottigella, of which the Renaissance portal is still preserved on the façade facing along via Mentana. In 1560 Giovanni Battista Busca, a member of a patrician family from Pavia, bought the palace from Bottigella's nephews. The palace was rebuilt, adapting the older building, by Carlo Antonio Busca in 1725 and then sold in 1750 to the Marquis Giasone del Maino. In 1863 the nearby San Matteo hospital bought the building from the Del Mainos. The hospital used the building for administrative offices. In 1932 the hospital moved to its new headquarters in viale Golgi and the building was sold to the university, which used it as the seat of administrative offices.

== Architecture ==
The palace was completely renovated, re-adapting the Renaissance building, by Carlo Antonio Busca in 1725. Of the older building, in addition to the portal, enriched by two columns, some fragmentary terracottas pertaining to the window and door frames, walled up in the palace courtyard. The building is structured around a central courtyard, while to the north, where Piazza Leonardo da Vinci is now, there was a large garden, which also incorporated a Romanesque tower. In 1933 the garden was handed over by the hospital to the municipality and became a public square. Externally, the building has a high ashlar plinth on the ground floor, while the following floors are enriched by large windows, punctuated by pilasters, friezes and sculptures in the Baroque style, the facade facing the garden, now overlooking Piazza Leonardo da Vinci, is instead characterized by a portico, also in ashlar, with five lights.

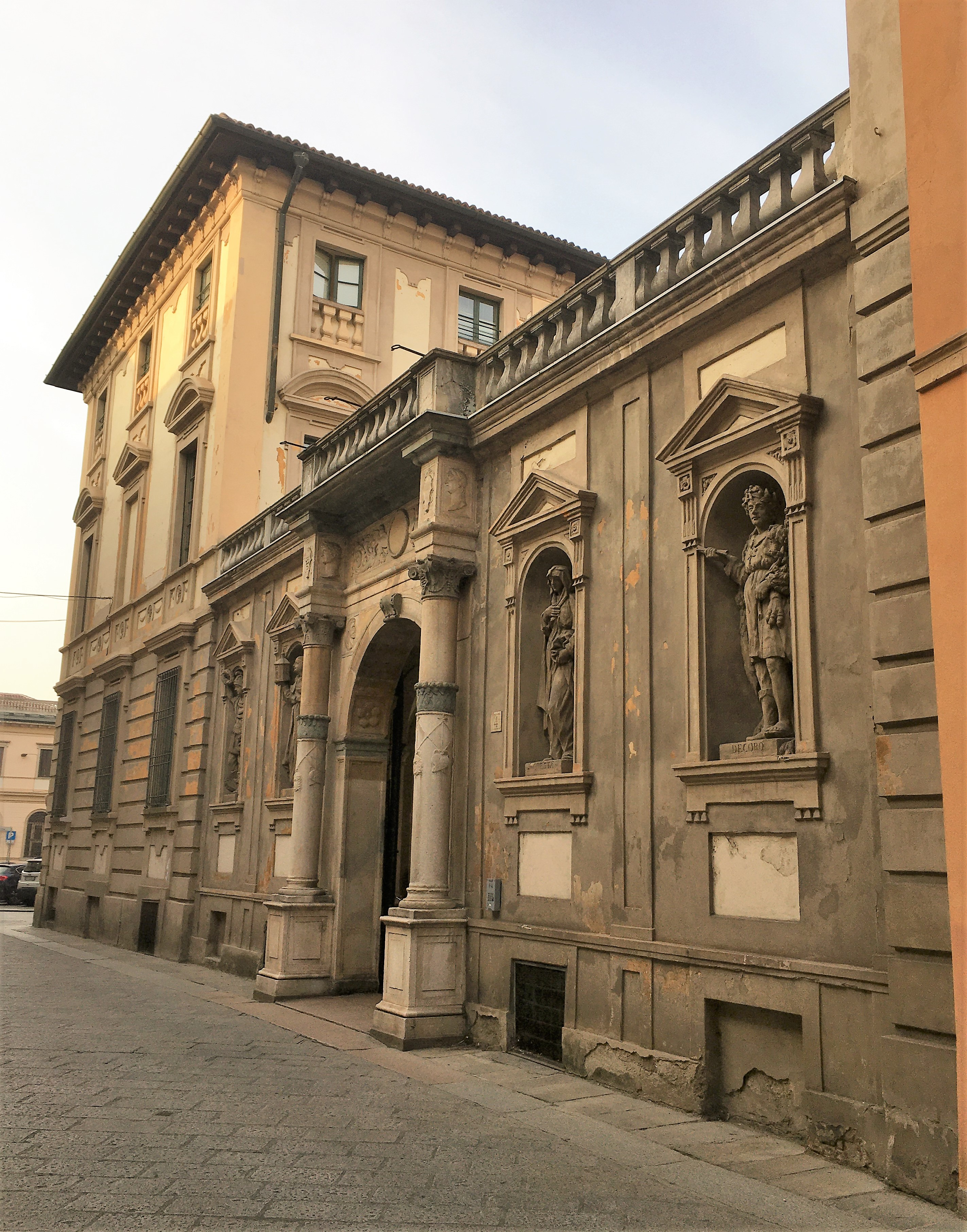
The façade along via Mentana, with the Renaissance marble portal in the centre, around 1480-1490.

Around 1769, the marquis del Maino had the entrance to the building moved to via Mentana, connecting the portico to this with an atrium which identified an axis through the courtyard, the noble area of the complex.

== Bibliography ==
- Marica Forni, Cultura e residenza aristocratica a Pavia tra '600 e '700, Milano, Franco Angeli, 1989.
- Luisa Erba, Giardini a Pavia. Principeschi, monastici, effimeri, magici, segreti, Roma, Gangemi Editore, 2005.
