= Towers of Pavia =

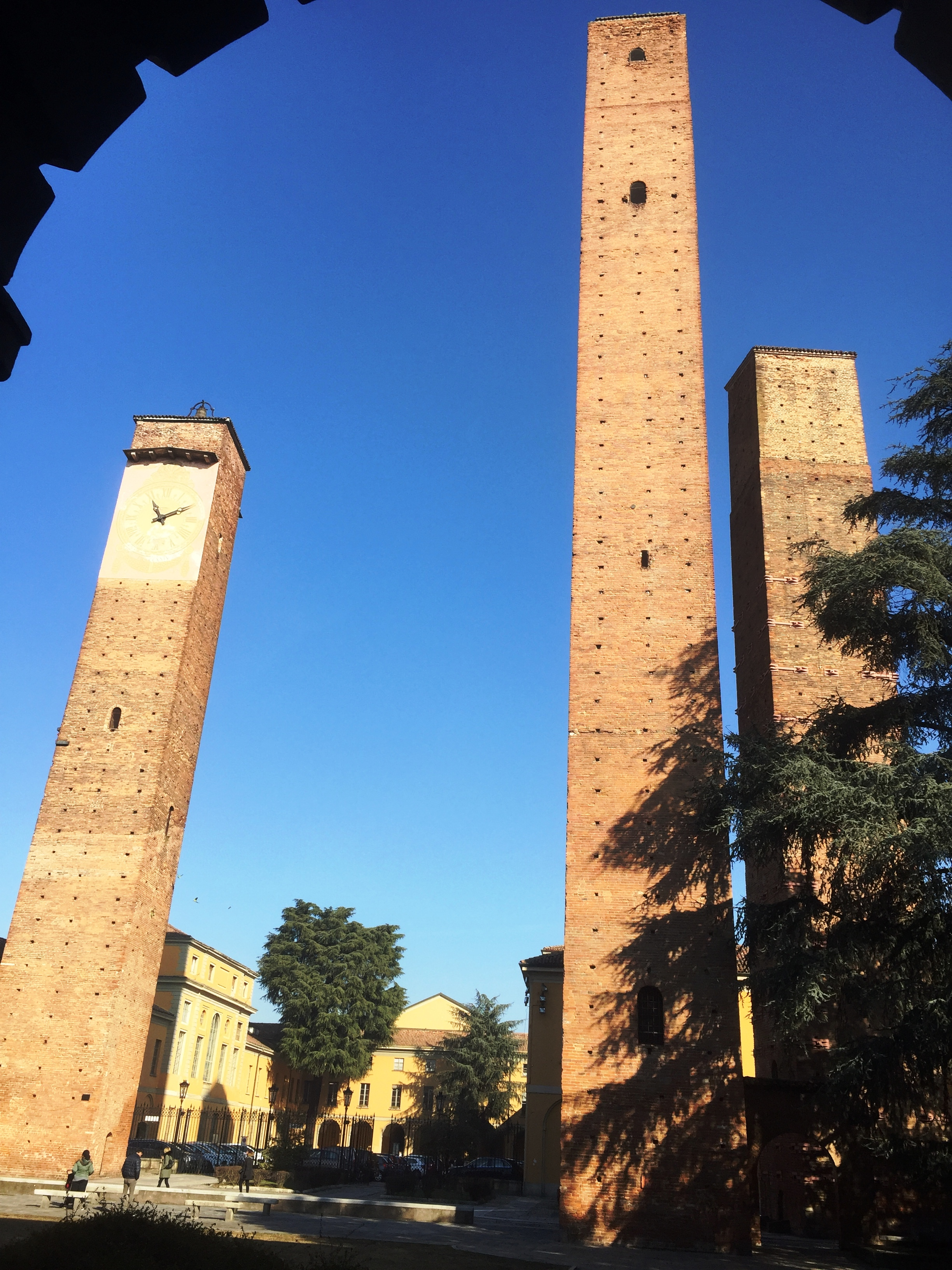
- The towers of Piazza Leonardo da Vinci.
- Periods: Middle Ages
- Location: Pavia, Italy

History
- Built: 11th - 13th century

Characteristic of the historic center of Pavia is the presence of medieval noble towers that survive in its urban fabric, despite having once been more numerous, as evidenced by the sixteenth-century representation of the city frescoed in the church of San Teodoro. They were mostly built between the 11th and 13th centuries when the Ghibelline city was at the height of its Romanesque flowering.

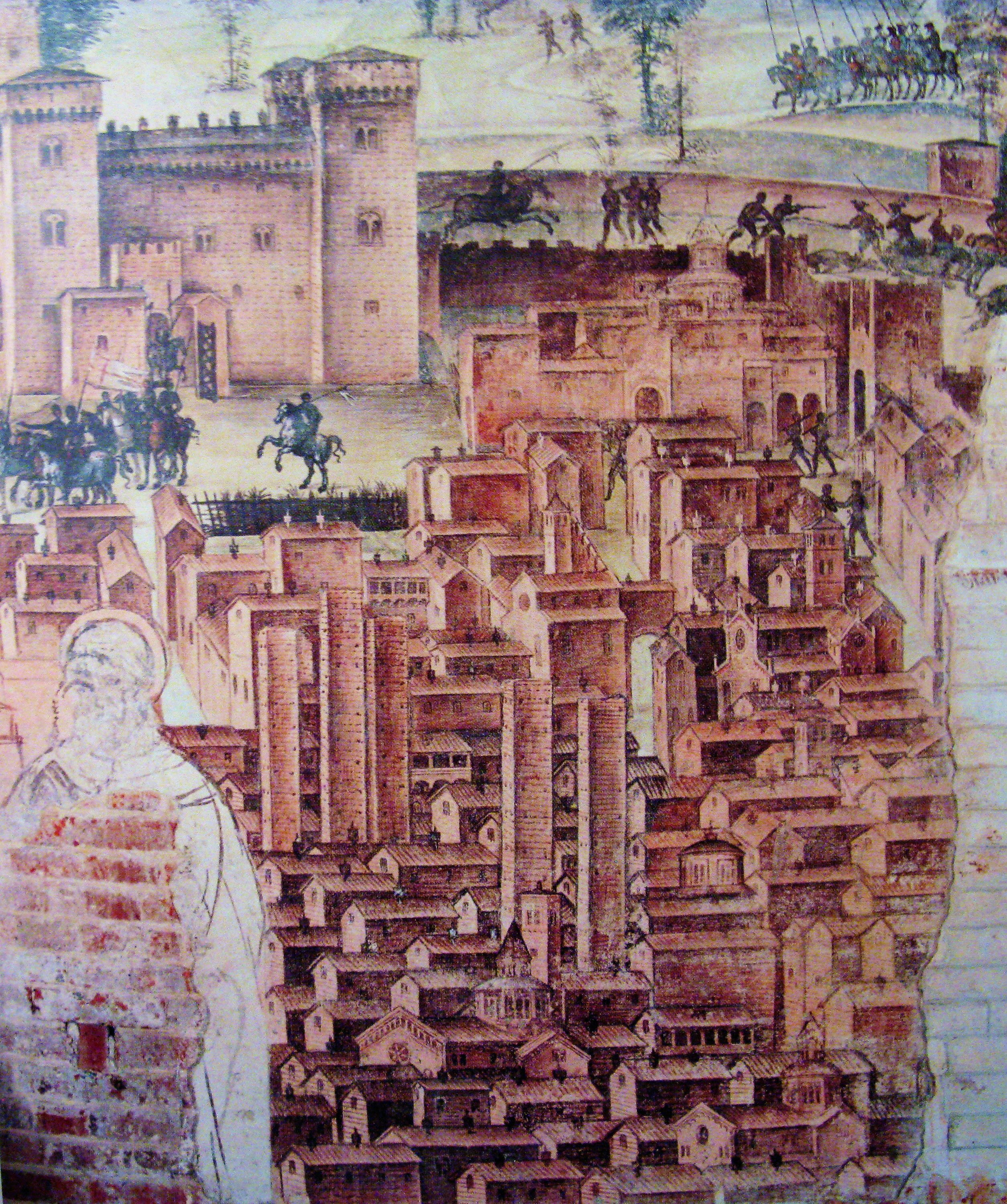
Church of San Teodoro, view of Pavia, detail (about 1522) some of the numerous towers still present in the first half of the sixteenth century can be seen.

== History ==
The first urban towers of Pavia are documented from the year 1018, also here as in much of northern Italy, well before the spread of the noble castles in the countryside, which makes us understand how the spread of these buildings was not dictated by urbanization of the aristocratic classes of the district in the city, but they were a city creation, influenced by the turreted residences of lay and ecclesiastical power, in turn inspired by the royal palaces (such as the Royal Palace of Pavia) of the Carolingian and Ottonian age. In Pavia, as in other cities, the towers were not built with defensive intentions, the size and height in fact made them unsuitable for such purposes, but for representative and propaganda tasks, they were in fact the most direct expression of greatness and power of the various family clans.

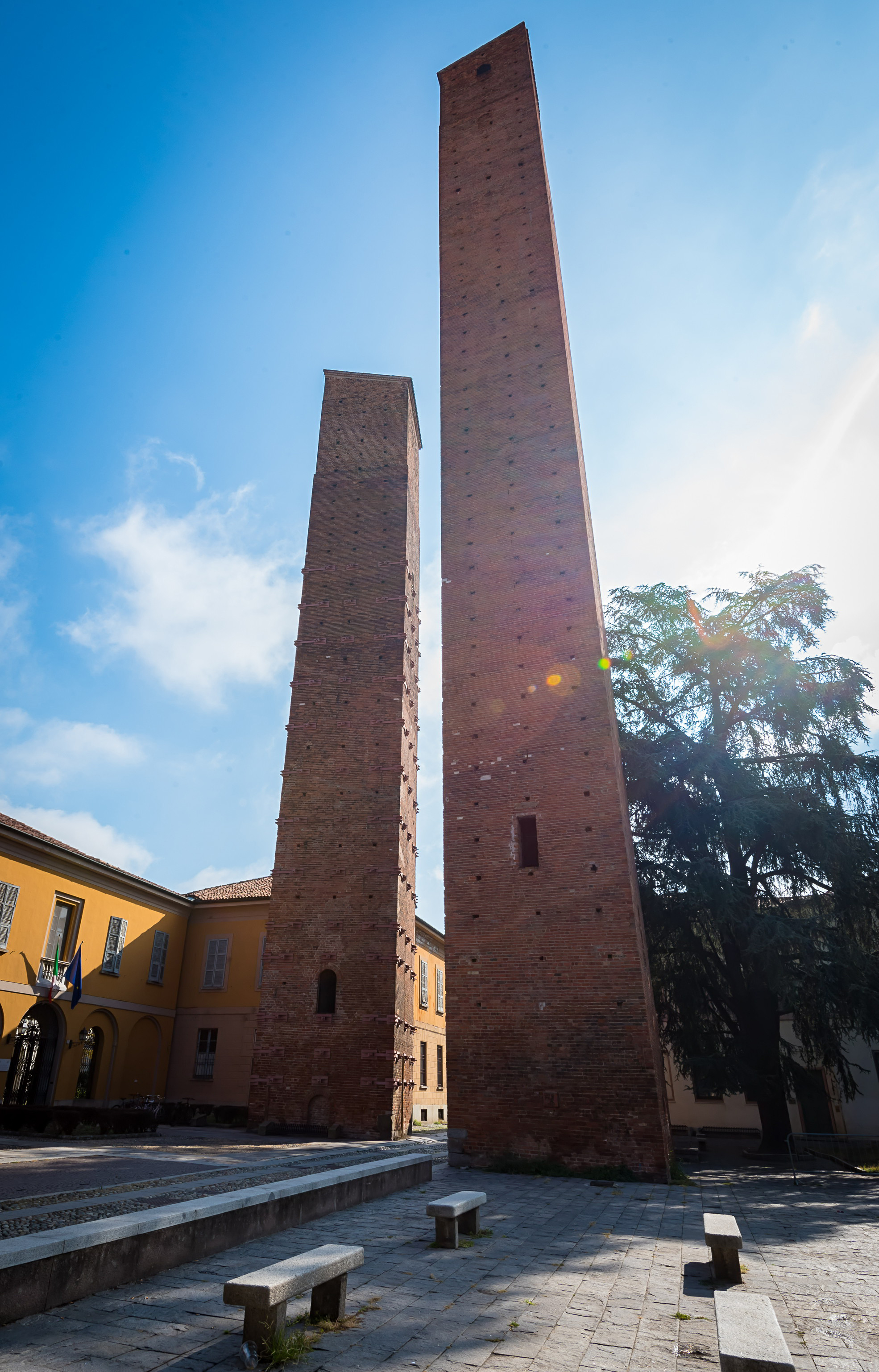
Torre del Maino.

Most of the towers were built in the corners of the blocks into which Pavia was divided, often flanked by a vault, which guaranteed the structure the effect of counterthrust. Within the first urban walls (Pavia at the end of the twelfth century had three circles of walls, the first of which dates back to the Roman age) most of the main urban factions had palaces and houses close to each other, to symbolize the political and social solidarity of the nucleus, these buildings were flanked by a tower, while the same families enjoyed the patronage of at least one, or even more, of the churches in the neighborhood. An emblematic case is the tower, still existing today, albeit reduced in height, of the tower of the Pavese family of Catassi, located at the corner between piazza della Posta and via Galliano, near which stood, in addition to the houses of the family group, also the churches of Saint John of the Catassi and San George of the Catassi. Often the same families had similar artifacts built, of smaller size, on their farms and possessions in the countryside, such as the Torti, who at Porta Pertusi (based on the estimates of 1254) controlled a district, where in fact there were the churches of Santa Onorata dei Torti and Santa Maria dei Torti, while in the countryside they held the fortified farm of Torre de 'Torti, mentioned for the first time in 1259 and still existing today.

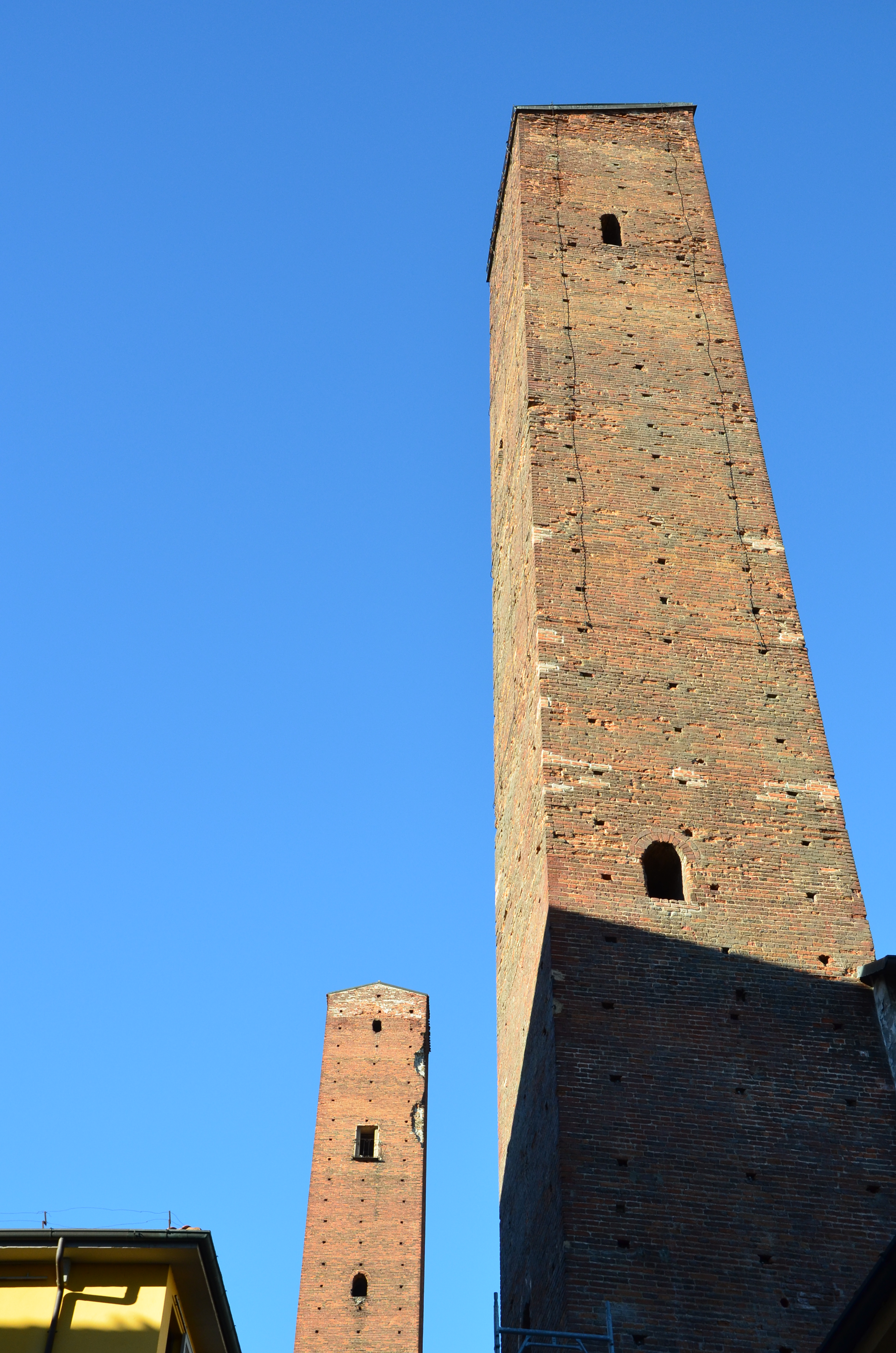
Towers of via Luigi Porta

With the affirmation of the Visconti lordship during the fourteenth century, the symbolic value of the towers lost meaning, so much so that many of them were reduced in height, while the terminal part of others was transformed into a loggia. The following centuries saw the decline of the building model; concerns related to the stability of the buildings, especially between the seventeenth and eighteenth centuries, decreed the demolition or lowering of most of them. Pavia, church of San Teodoro, view of Pavia, detail (about 1522) some of the numerous towers still present in the first half of the sixteenth century can be seen. The noble towers present in Pavia, on the basis of historical and iconographic documentation, must have been about 65, of which about twenty survive.

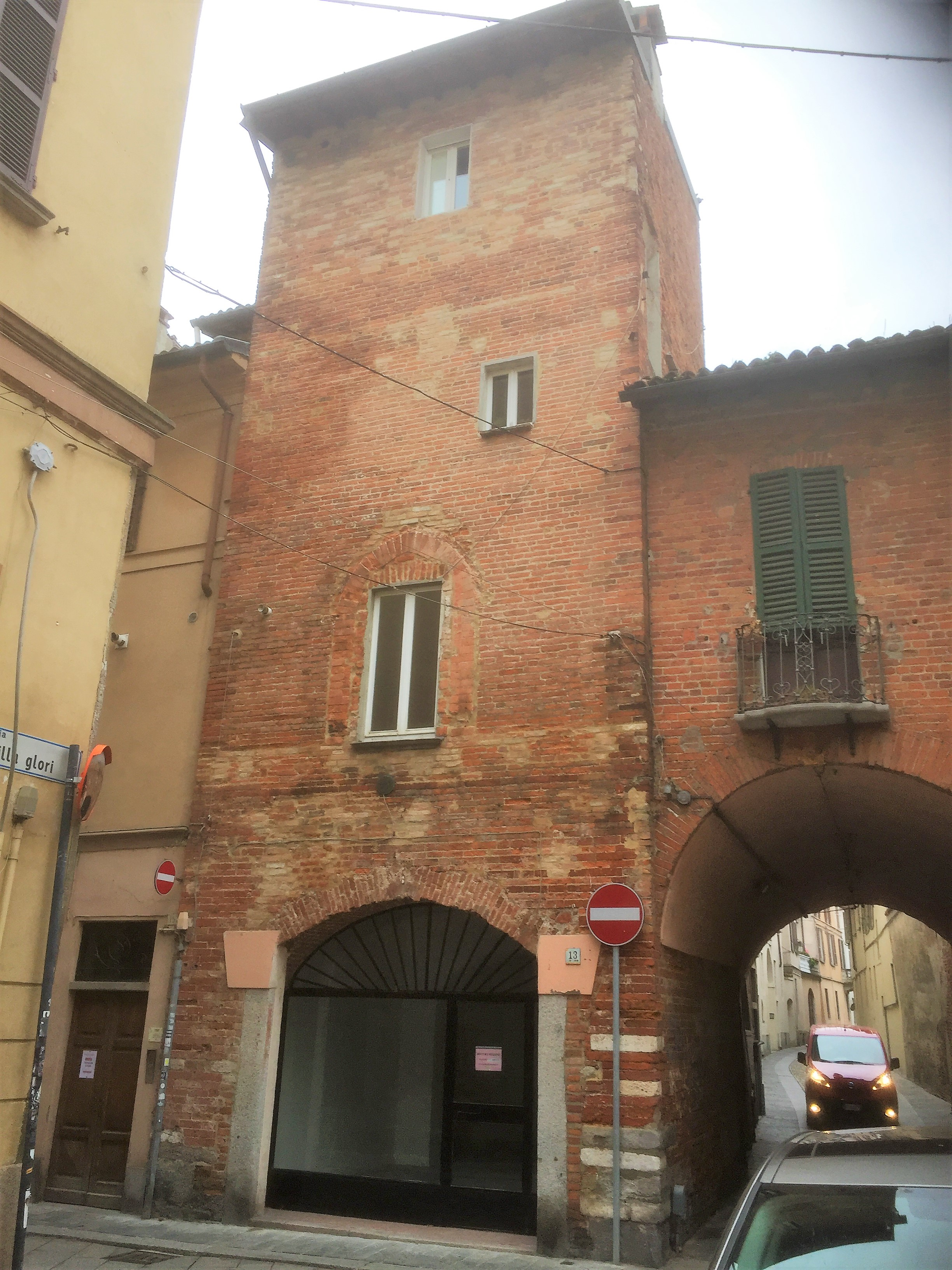
Tower of via Sant'Ennodio, corner Corso Garibaldi.

== Architecture ==
The impressive surviving noble towers are built on a massive foundation block, made up of river pebbles bound with mortar, even more than 2 meters high. These are buildings with a square plan, long, on average 5 meters per side (although we have examples of larger towers). The base of the towers is reinforced with large stones, often thickened only in the corners. The most used stone materials are granite, gneiss, sandstone and, to a lesser extent, limestone and, in particular, Veronese ammonite limestone, these are often reused materials, generally coming from buildings of the classical age. The shaft of the towers, on the other hand, was made of exposed bricks, laid with an accurate masonry texture and with dimensions of about 27.5 x 6.5 cm, for a height of 13 cm. The thickness of the walls is about 2 meters, formed by a layer of conglomerate of pebbles, lime and shards, strengthened inside by wooden chains and encased between two brick walls, a construction technique already illustrated by Vitruvius. The openings of the towers are rare, in fact, in addition to the pontoon holes, only small single-lancet windows remain, while access was generally allowed through doors located on the upper floors and connected to the adjacent buildings. Although most of the noble towers are now reduced in height, so much so that most of them are equated to the level of the houses and palaces nearby, still today some buildings of considerable height stand out against the sky of Pavia, such as the Maino tower, high 51 meters, or the tower of San Dalmazio (41 meters), real skyscrapers for the time.

== List of surviving towers ==
- University Tower, Piazza Leonardo da Vinci.
- Clock Tower, Piazza Leonardo da Vinci.
- Torre del Maino, Piazza Leonardo da Vinci.
- Tower of San Dalmazio, Via Luigi Porta.
- Belcredi Tower, via Luigi Porta.
- Tower of Santa Mostiola, Via Luigi Porta.
- Torre dei Catassi, corner of Piazza della Posta- Via Galliano.
- Tower of Casa Beccaria May between Piazza Borromeo and Via San Giovanni in Borgo.
- Tower of Piazza Borromeo.
- Tower of Via Scarpa, corner of Via Pedotti.
- Tower of Via Capsoni.
- Tower of via della Rocchetta, corner of Via Capsoni.
- Tower of Via Sant’Ennodio, corner of Corso Garibaldi.
- Tower (base only) of Via Ressi, corner of Via Corridoni.
- Tower of Via Siro Comi, corner of Corso Garibaldi.
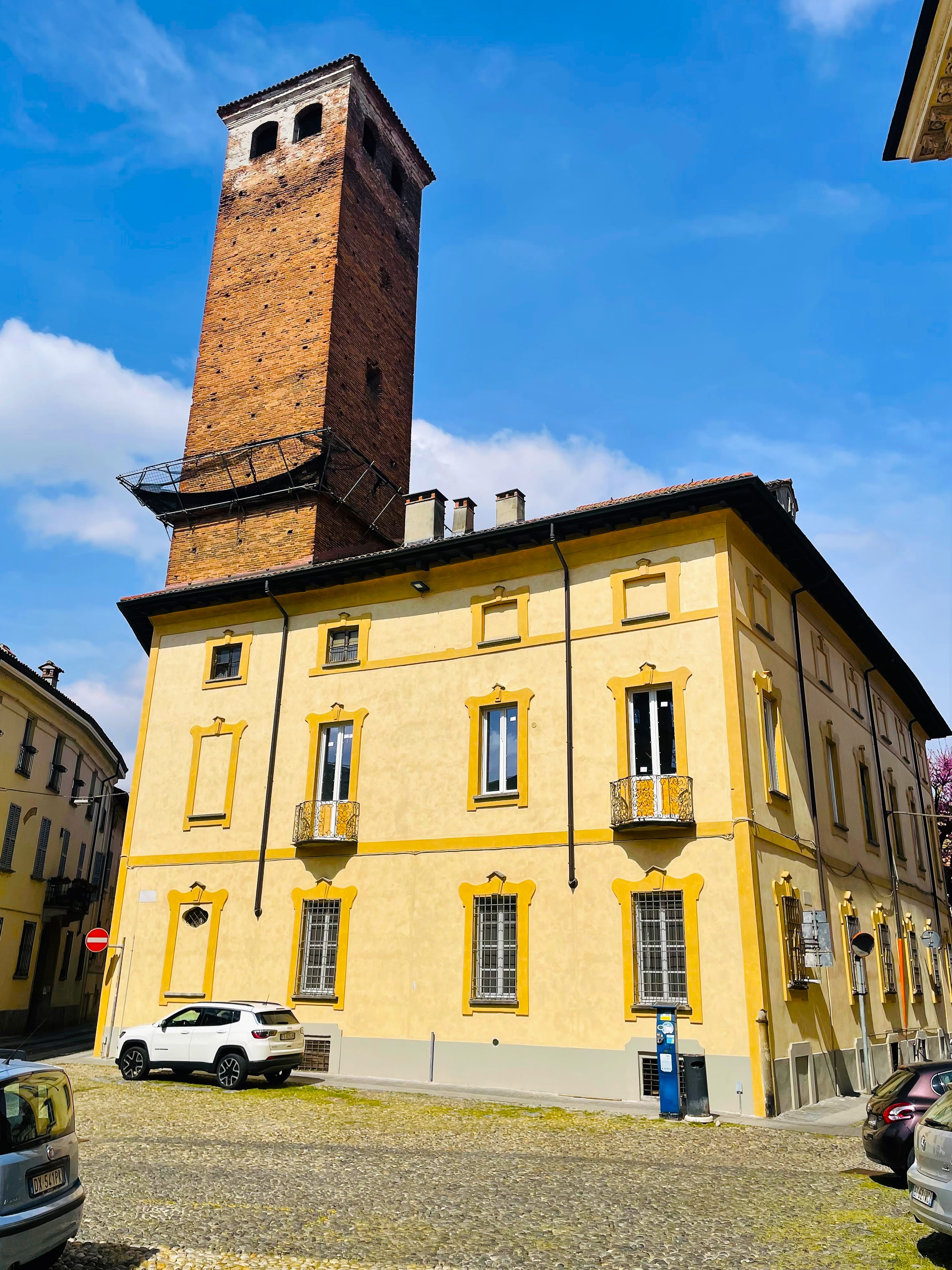
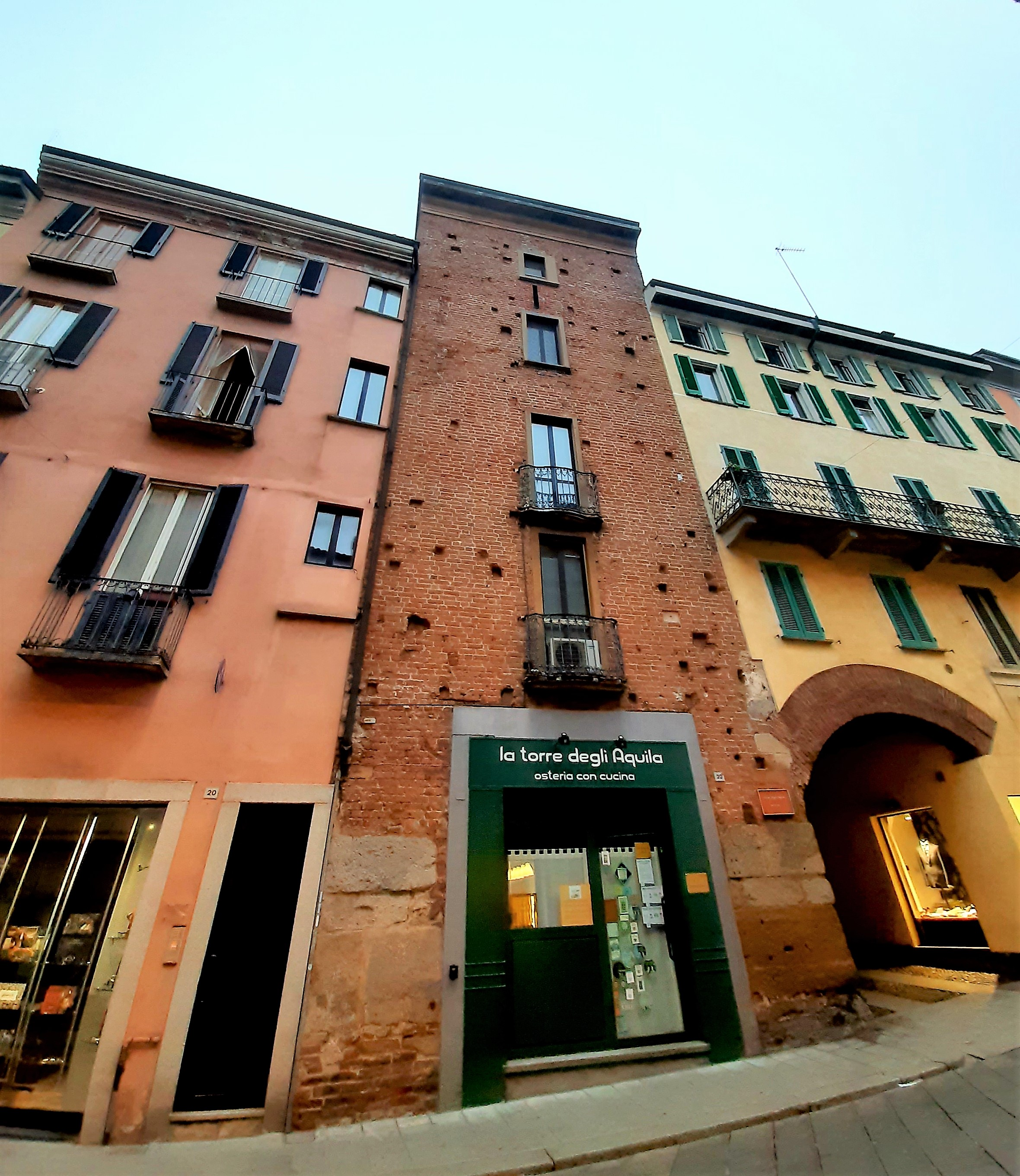
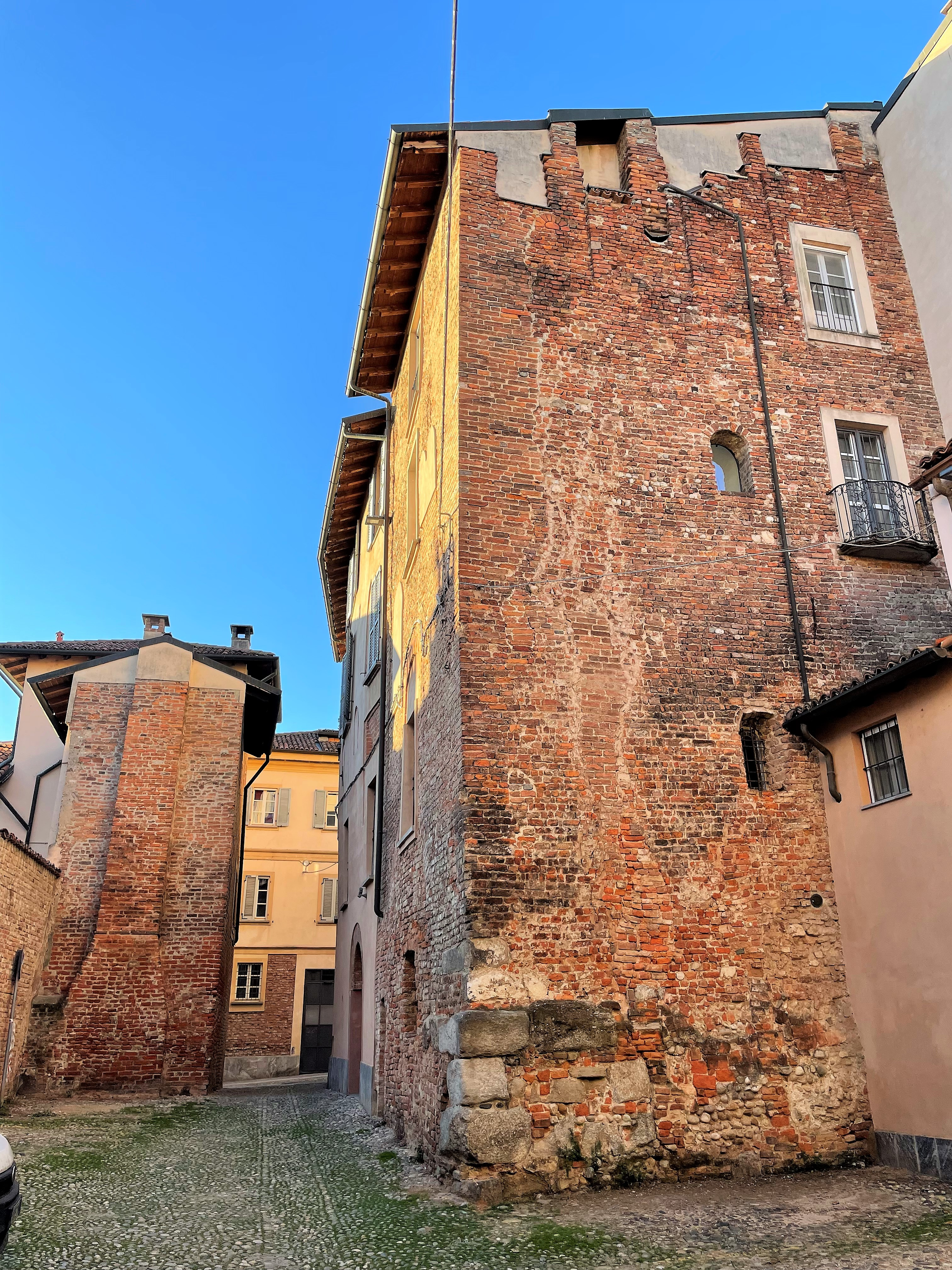
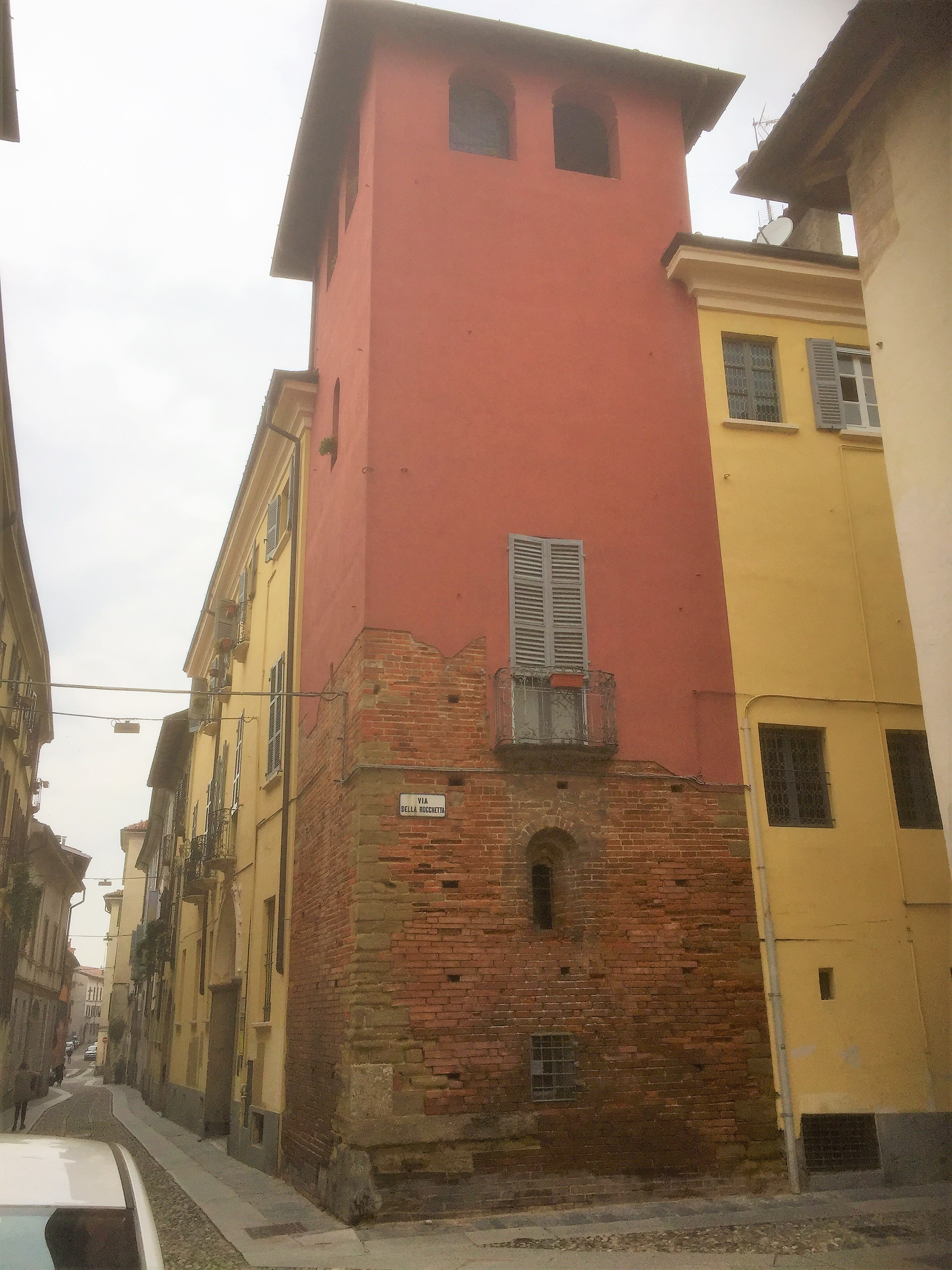
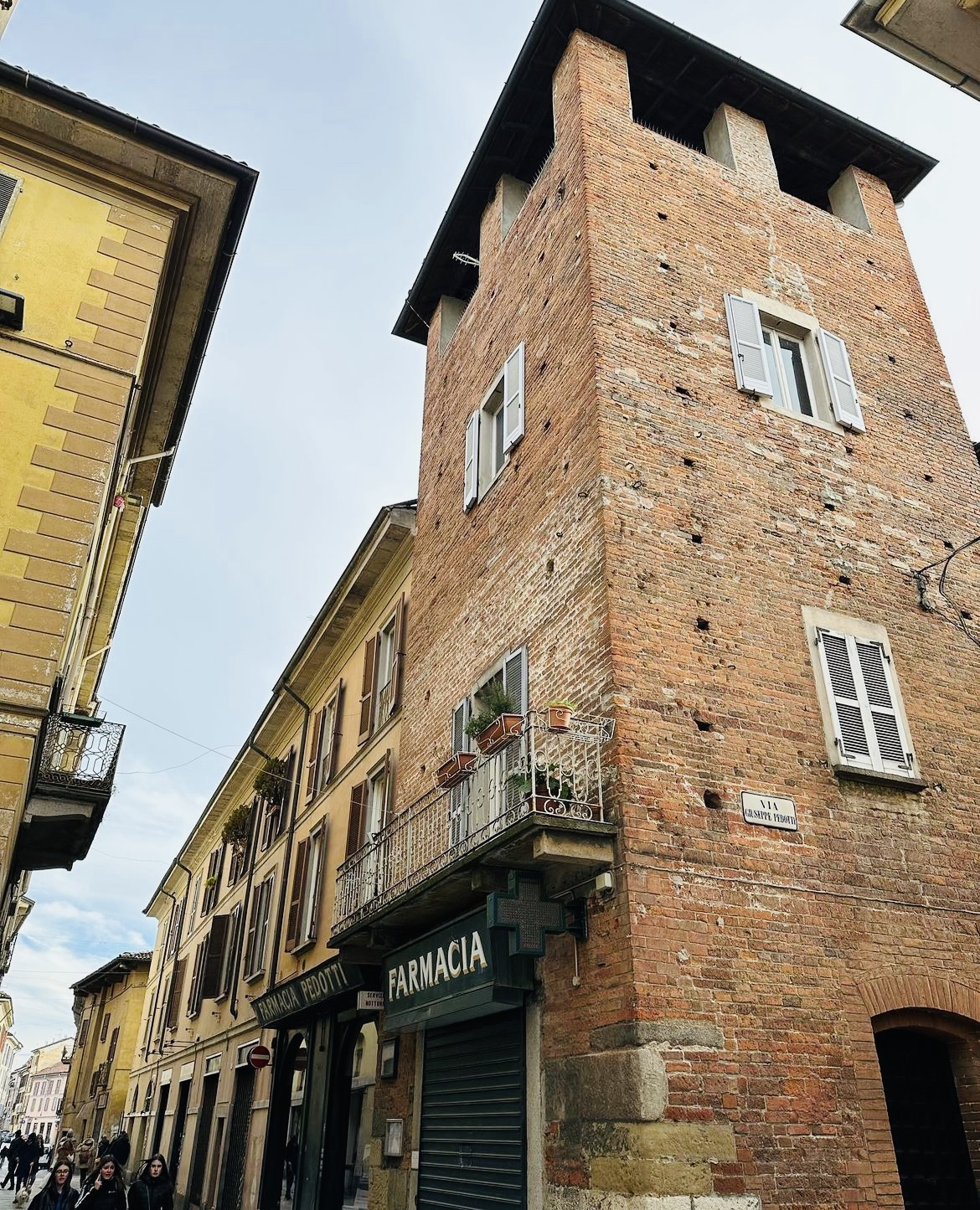
The tower of piazza Borromeo, Torre degli Aquila, Strada Nuova, Tower of vicolo del Torrione, Tower of via della Rocchetta, corner of Via Capsoni, Tower of Corso Garibaldi.

- Tower of Via Mentana, corner of Via Galliano.
- Tower of Via Sacchi, corner of Via Spallanzani.
- Torre degli Aquila, Strada Nuova.
- Tower of Via dei Liguri, corner of Vicolo del Torrione.
- Tower of Via Pessani, corner of Via Maffi.
- Tower of Via Frank, corner of Via Cardano.
- Vicolo Novaria Tower.
- Remains of two towers in a basement in Via Luigi Porta.

== Bibliography ==
- Marta Brambati, Architettura civile nel Medioevo: le torri “minori” di Pavia, in “Annali di Storia Pavese”, XXVII (1999), pp. 61- 72.
- Marialuisa Sacchi, L’architettura civile del Medioevo in Pavia: analisi di alcune torri private, in “Bollettino della Società Pavese di storia Patria”, XLIX (1997), pp. 59- 115.
- Donata Vicini, Lineamenti urbanistici dal XII secolo all'età sforzesca, in Storia di Pavia, III, L'arte dall'XI al XVI secolo, Milano, Banca del Monte di Lombardia, 1996, pp. 9- 81.
- Peter Hudson, Archeologia urbana e programmazione della ricerca: l’esempio di Pavia, Firenze, All’Insegna del Giglio, 1981.
- Aldo A. Settia, L’esportazione di un modello urbano: torri e caseforti nelle campagne del Nord Italia, in “Società e Storia”, XII (1981), pp. 237- 297.
- Crisanto Zuradelli, Le torri di Pavia, Pavia, Fusi, 1888.
