= Theodore of Pavia =

Saint Theodore or San Teodoro

Bishop of Pavia
- Died: 778
- Venerated in: Roman Catholic Church; Eastern Orthodox Church
- Canonized: Pre-congregation
- Feast: 20 May
- Patronage: Pavia, Italy

San Teodoro or Saint Theodore of Pavia (died c. 778) was bishop of Pavia from 743 until his death. He was repeatedly exiled by the Lombard kings. His feast day is May 20. Along with Syrus (Siro), he is a patron saint of Pavia, and his body is housed in the church with his name.

== See also ==
- Diocese of Pavia
