= San Teodoro, Pavia =

Coordinates: 45.1831°N 9.1514°E

- San Teodoro
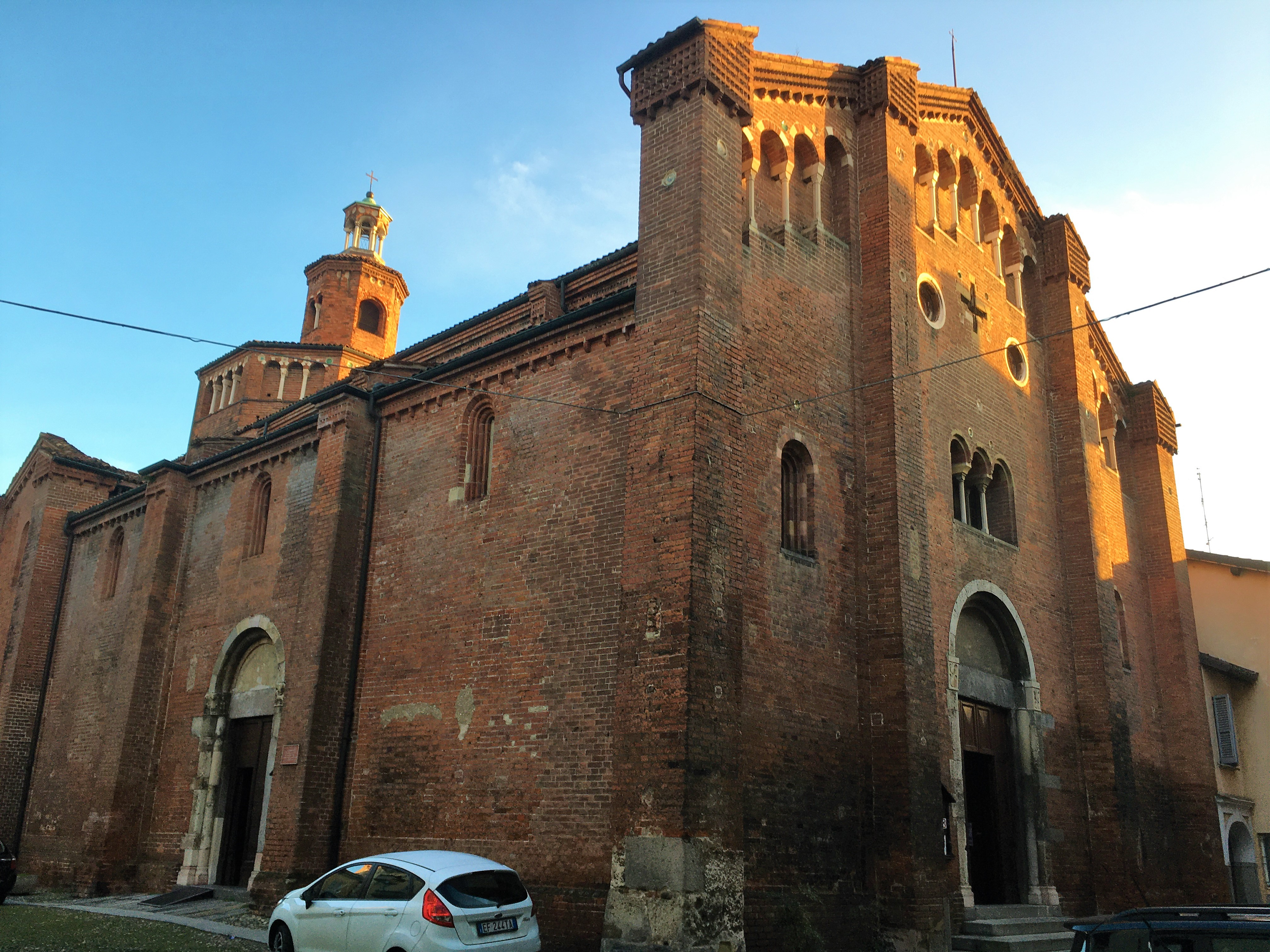
- Façade of the building

- Location within Northern Italy
- Location: Pavia
- Country: Italy
- Denomination: Catholic

History
- Founded: 752
- Dedication: Theodore of Pavia

Architecture
- Functional status: Active
- Style: Romanesque

Specifications
- Materials: Brick, sandstone

Administration
- Diocese: Diocese of Pavia

San Teodoro is a Romanesque-style Roman Catholic church in the town center of Pavia, Italy.

== History ==
A church at the site is documented since the year 752. The parish is cited in documents from the mid-13th-century. Initially the church was dedicated to Saint Agnes, but by the year 1000, it was dedicated to San Teodoro, bishop of Pavia who died in 778. The body of the saint, who is the protector of fisherman and those working in the River Ticino, is housed in the main altar.

== Description ==
San Teodoro was built in late Romanesque style in Lombard brick between 12th and 13th century. It has a basilica layout with three apses, of which the central one is deeper, divided into three naves of three bays each, with the transept just mentioned. The central nave is twice as wide as the lateral ones. The roof is sometimes cross vaults supported by cruciform pillars of the Romanesque type that are not perfectly aligned. The spans corresponding to the transept have a barrel vault. Above the transept is the dome, divided into a lower part, consisting of a gallery of arches on columns, and an upper one of smaller dimensions. The whole is dominated by a roof lantern. On the southern side are the sacristy and the bell tower from the mid-16th century.

On the façade there are numerous Arab or Byzantine ceramic plates also present in the other Romanesque churches in Pavia, such as the Basilica of San Pietro in Ciel d'Oro. The presbytery is raised on the crypt dating back to the thirteenth century. In the southern transept there are frescoes of the Stories of Sant'Agnese, a work created around 1519 by an unknown Lombard artist (defined by critics as the Master of the Stories of Sant'Agnese) who is characterized by a style that is not very Lombard and greatly influenced by both Ferrara school, both from the culture and classicism of central Italy.

On the left wall of the transept there is the fresco depicting the cycle of the stories of San Teodoro, made by an anonymous Lombard artist in 1514 as part of the renewal of the decoration of the church commissioned by Luchino Corti, as attested by the inscription placed in the upper frame.

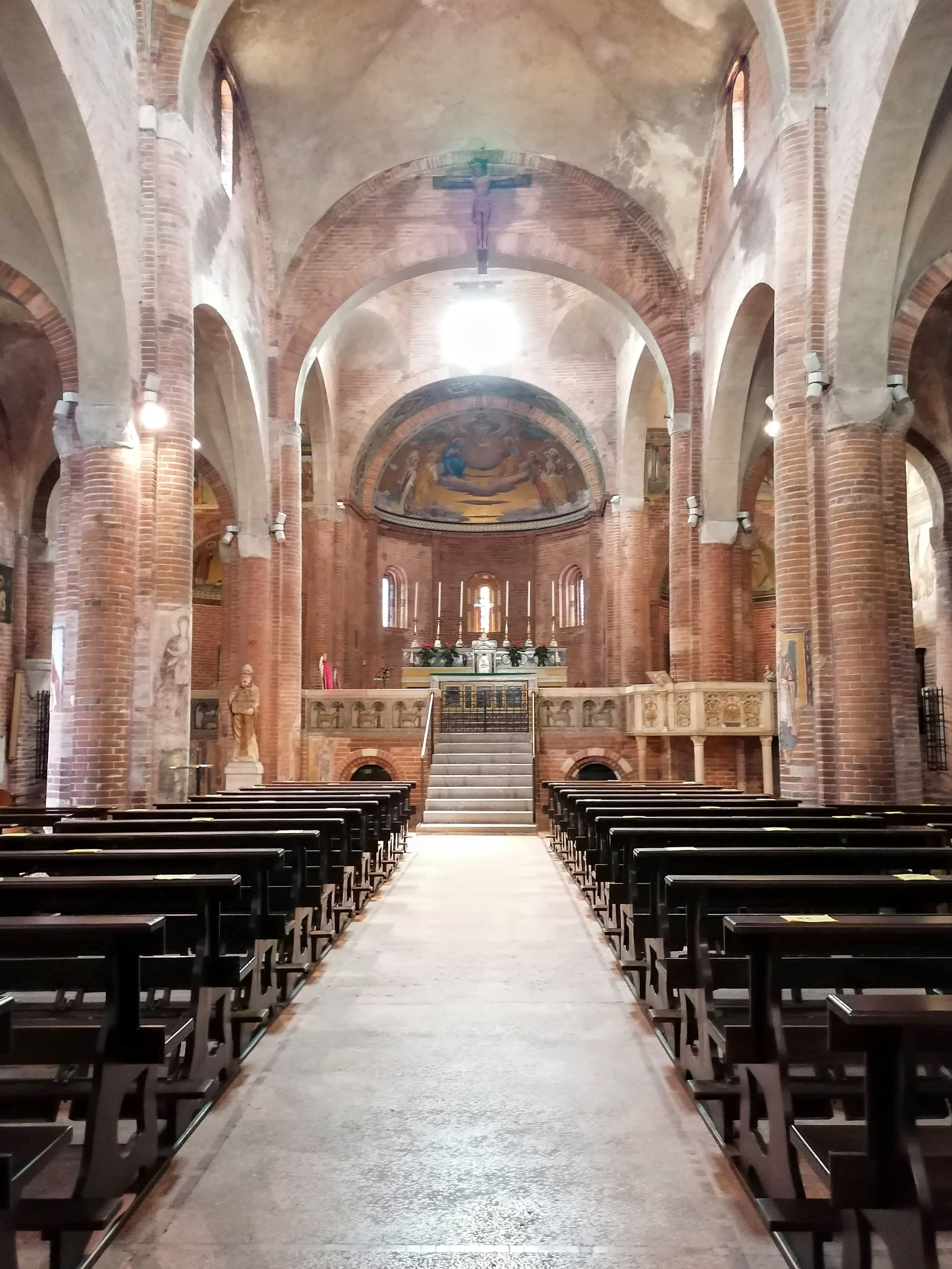
Interior.

The cycle is made up of 12 panels, arranged in three bands with scenes described in great detail. Each episode is accompanied by a caption placed under the painting. The cycle is based on the tradition that Theodore savior of the Lombard city, besieged in vain by Charlemagne as it was protected with miracles by its bishop. Theodore in fact caused the Ticino waters to swell, flooding the encampment of the Franks and forcing Charlemagne to abandon the siege. In reality, things did not go this way and Charlemagne conquered Pavia.

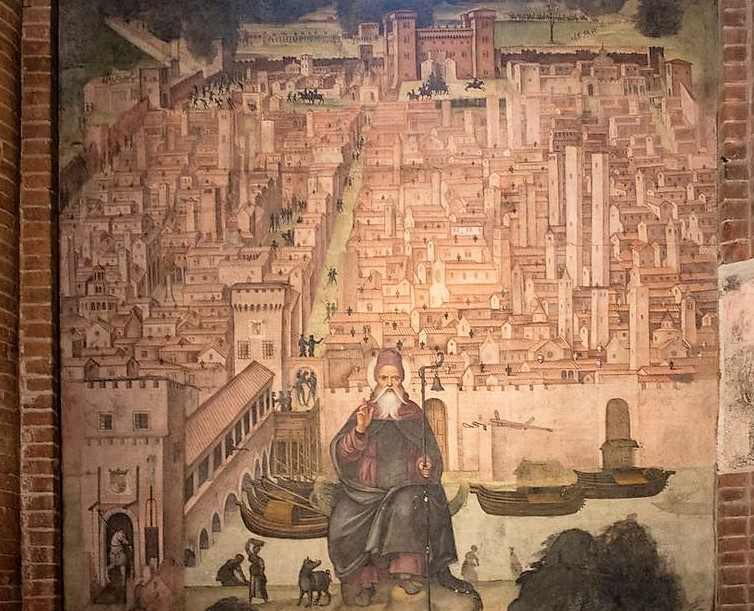
ex voto for the victory in the siege of 1522. 1523–1524

In front of the crypt there is a polychrome marble statue of San Teodoro dating back to the fourteenth century, which bears the symbolic representation of the city of Pavia. On the pillars of the church there are numerous votive frescoes from the 13th century. In the first span of the left aisle, behind the baptistery, there are two views of Pavia, the first, completed, was torn and brought back to canvas in 1956, since during the restorations it was realized that it concealed a second unfinished fresco (with the same theme). The views were commissioned by the parish priest Giovanni Luchino Corti as a civic ex voto for the victory in the siege of 1522 (in that year the city was besieged by the French, who were however defeated) and were, perhaps, made by Bernardino Lanzani or by an anonymous Lombard artist (defined by critics as Master of the Stories of Sant'Agnese) between the 1522 and 1524. The city is represented in a realistic way, the main buildings of Pavia can be observed, while fighting around the walls are also represented. In the center stands the figure of Saint Anthony the Great (owner of the chapel and protector of the suburb of Pavia located beyond the Ticino) while in the sky, above the city, are the figures of the Eternal Father, the Saint Syrus, Teodoro and Augustine. While the ceiling of the chapel is frescoed with grotesques with an archaeological and sacred subject at the same time, including the Adoration of the Magi.

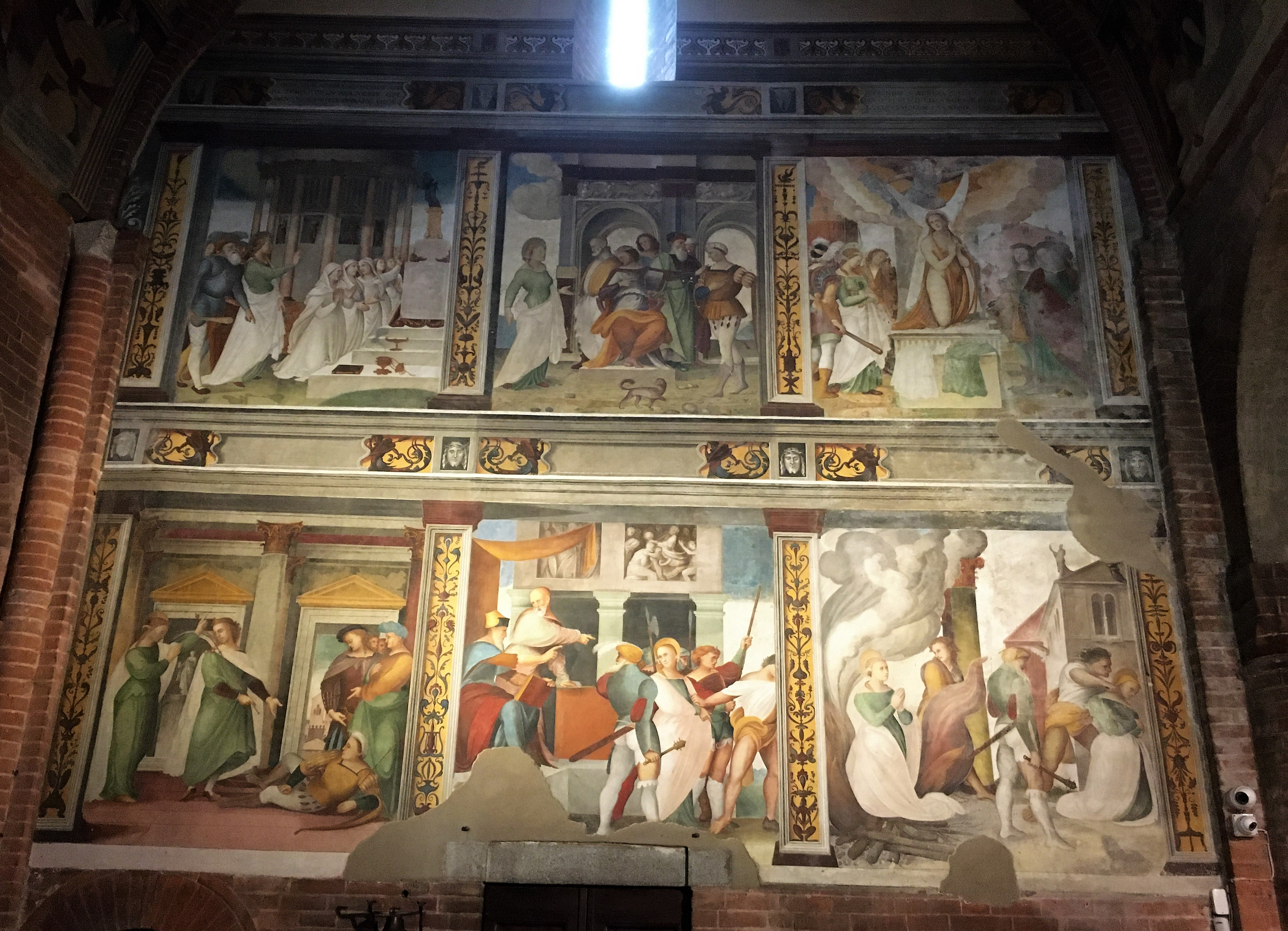
Storie di Sant’Agnese, 1514

In 1998, during the works for the reconstruction of the heating system, in the first bay of the right aisle, a 12th century mosaic was discovered with scenes surrounded by bands with decorative and iconographic motifs typical of the Romanesque repertoire. The mosaic may have been covered due to interventions due to the subsidence of the ground which occurred in this part of the church.

In front of the entrance to the crypt stands a painted marble statue made by Bonino da Campione between 1340 and 1350, depicting Saint Theodore. The saint is shown holding a model of the city of Pavia.

The crypt houses the granite ark of Saint Theodore and the funerary monument of the parish priest Luchino Corti, dating from the first half of the sixteenth century.

The vault of the crypt is decorated with frescoes painted between 1510 and 1520 by the Master of the Stories of Saint Agnes.

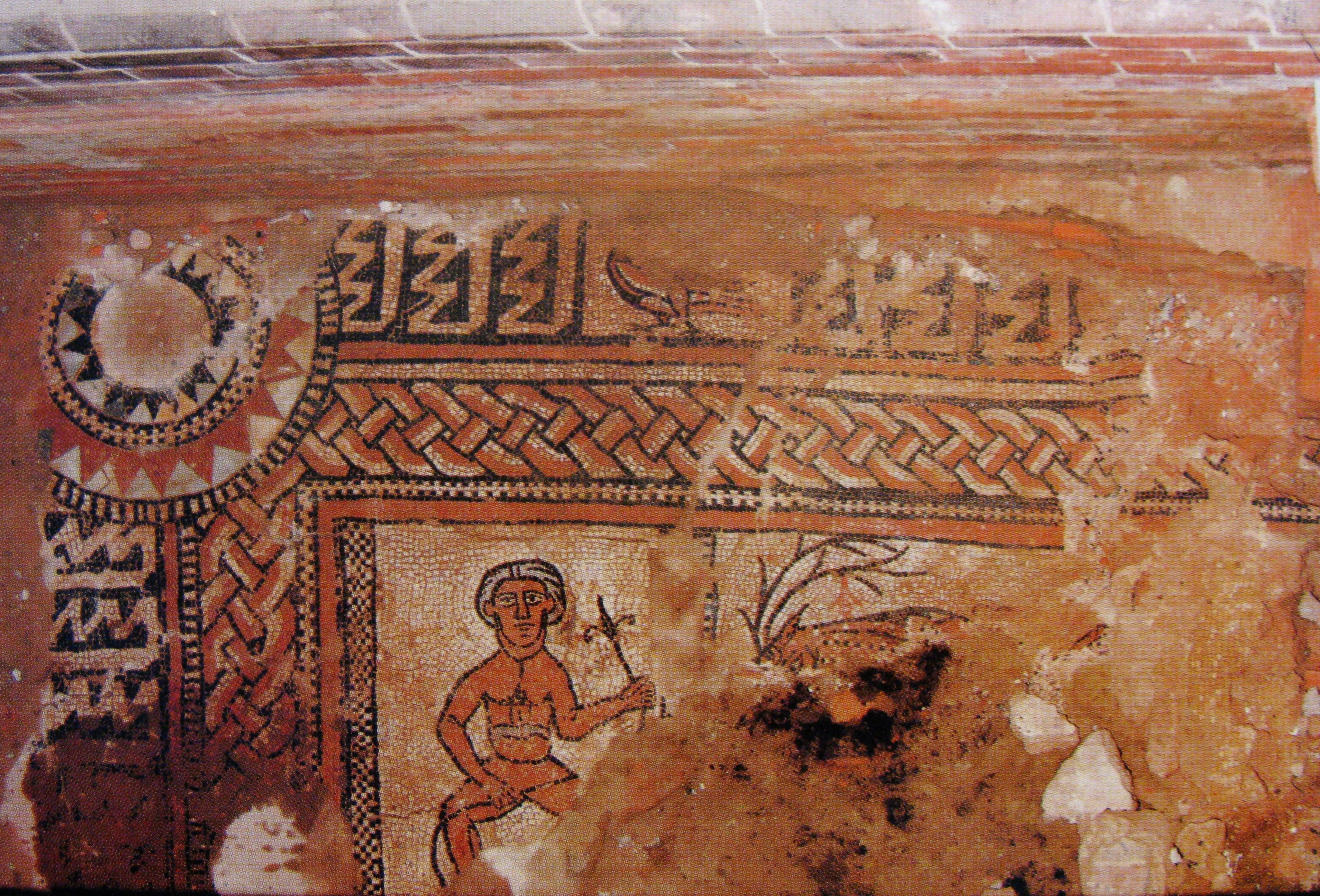
Mosaic, 12th century
