= Galleria Arnaboldi =

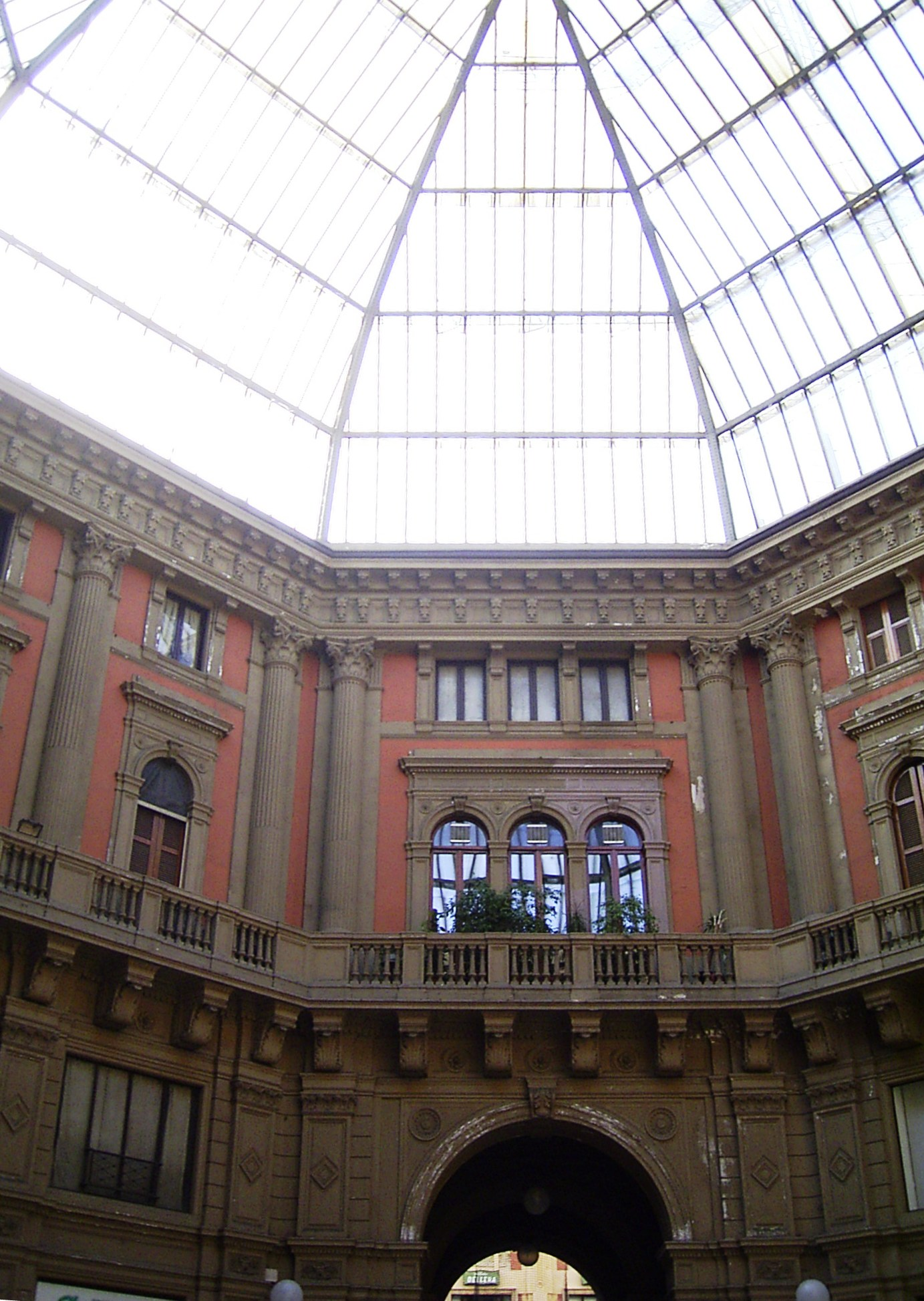
- Location: Pavia, Italy
- Coordinates: 45°11′05″N 9°09′19″E
- Opened: 1882
- Owner: Comune of Pavia
- Architect: Ercole Balossi

Galleria Arnaboldi is a shopping arcade in Pavia, in Lombardy, which, in the form of a covered pedestrian street, connects Strada Nuova to Piazza del Lino.

== History ==
In 1878, on the occasion of the enlargement of Strada Nuova, the then mayor of Pavia Bernardo Arnaboldi Gazzaniga proposed to have a new building built, at his own expense, for agricultural trade and banking transactions. Bernardo Arnaboldi Gazzaniga then bought the buildings that stood on the area identified as the site of the new gallery and had them demolished. He then commissioned the architect Ercole Balossi to design the building over an area of over 2000 m². The design, presented in June 1879, was completed with some variations by the spring of 1882.

== Architecture ==
The new construction occupied the vast area between Strada Nuova, via Varese and piazza del Lino (where the 13th century Palazzo del Popolo once stood, the remains of which were demolished during the construction of the tunnel) constituting for the latter an element connection with the centre, through the public transit tunnel formed by the entrance hall, the central hall and the eastern portico, transferred in perpetual use to the municipality. Around the actual market hall, an octagonal space covered with a transparent glass dome, there are forty land-based rooms used as shops and, on the upper floors, several houses. The Neo-Renaissance style is adopted both outside (the three facades facing the street) and inside (the elevations on the octagon).

Ercole Balossi adopted a Neo-Renaissance style because in those years it was considered more suited to a building that also had public functions. The decoration consists of classical motifs, such as the window frames, the tympanums and the capitals of the columns. Inside, the large room is surmounted by a balcony supported by corbels.

However, Ercole Balossi imposes a new-concept roof on this traditional structure, a large dome with iron reinforcement (made by the Necchi company of Pavia) and double transparent glazing, surmounted by a small dome and an iron lightning rod with a platinum cusp.
