= Battle of Rottofreddo =

Battle of the War of Austrian Succession (1746)

Coordinates: 45°03′N 09°33′E

- Part of the War of the Austrian Succession
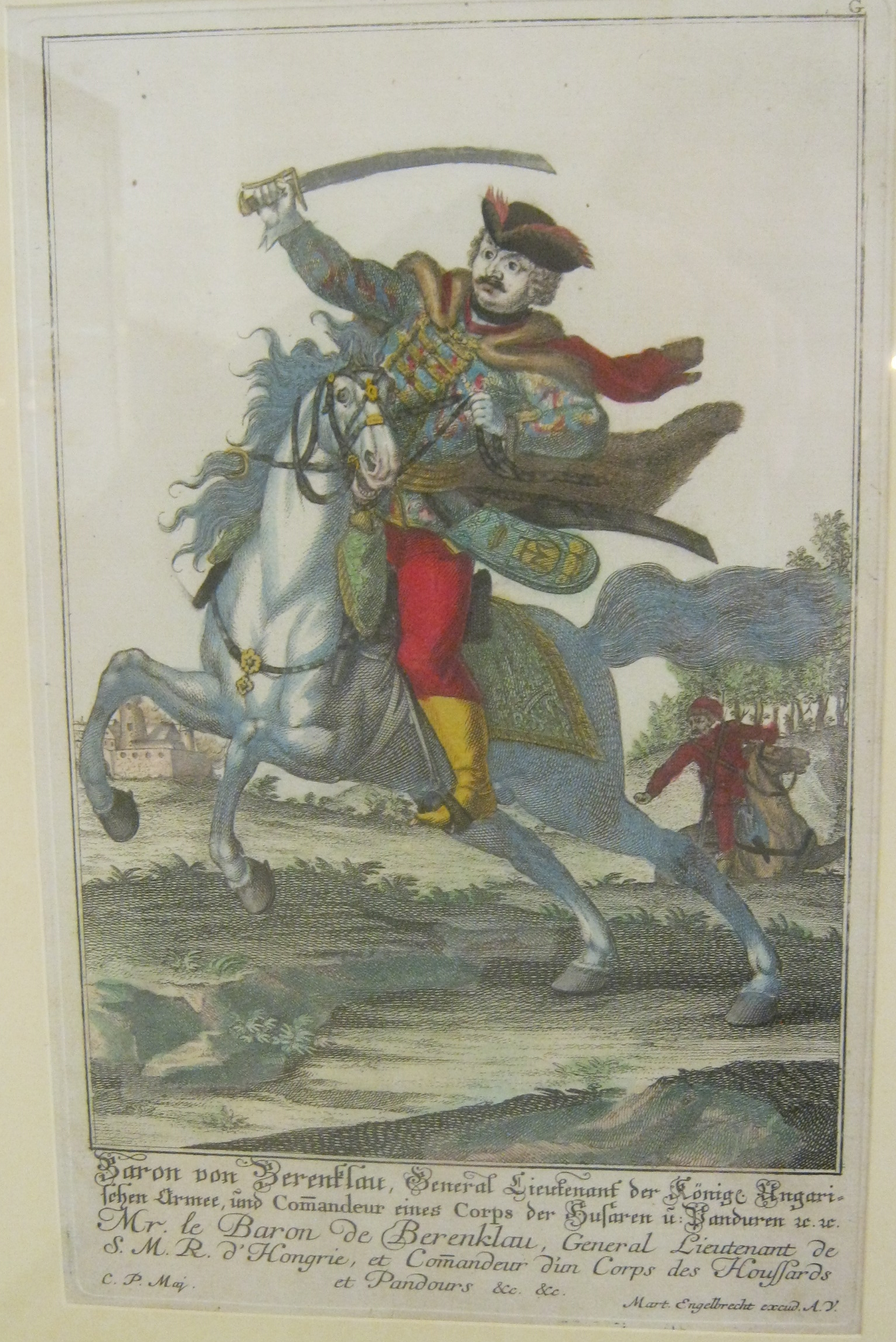
- Austrian Feldmarschall-Leutnant Bärnklau was killed.
Date	10 August 1746
Location	Rottofreno, Province of Piacenza, Italy
Result	Austrian victory (Note: Bodart always placed the victorious army on the left side of the page.)

Belligerents
Habsburg Austria	France; Spain

Commanders and leaders
(Habsburg monarchy) Count Botta Adorno (Habsburg monarchy) Graf Ulysses Browne (Habsburg monarchy) Johann Bärnklau †	(Kingdom of France) Marshal Maillebois (Spain) Comte de Gages

Strength
30,000	25,000

Casualties and losses
3,000–4,000	6,000–8,000, 18–19 guns

The Battle of Rottofreddo or Rottofreno (10 August 1746) was fought during the War of Austrian Succession between a Habsburg Austrian army and a Bourbon army consisting of Spanish and French forces. The Spanish were led by Jean Thierry du Mont, comte de Gages and the French by Jean-Baptiste Francois des Marets, marquis de Maillebois. The Franco-Spanish army was isolated by the Austrian and Sardinian armies and trying to escape after being badly defeated in the Battle of Piacenza. In a bold move led by Marshal Maillebois, the Bourbon army crossed to the south bank of the Po River west of Piacenza, intending to march west. Austrian forces led by Antoniotto Botta Adorno attacked the Franco-Spanish rearguard, inflicting serious losses, but were unable to prevent the Bourbon army from getting away to Tortona.

== Background ==
The War of the Austrian Succession began on 16 December 1740 when the Kingdom of Prussia invaded Silesia, a province of the Habsburg monarchy. Forceful diplomacy by the Kingdom of France enlisted the Electorate of Bavaria, and the Electorate of Saxony in the anti-Austrian alliance. On 15 September 1741, Linz was captured by a Franco-Bavarian army. With most of Austria's army transferred out of Italy, King Philip V of Spain and his Queen Elizabeth Farnese wanted to seize a domain in Italy for their son Don Philip. Taking advantage of a weak Kingdom of Great Britain naval squadron, Spain landed 14,000 troops in Italy in November 1741 and 12,800 more in January 1742. This threatening move pushed a wavering Kingdom of Sardinia into alliance with Austria. After ten months of fruitless campaigning, 13,000 Spanish under Jean Thierry du Mont, comte de Gages fought 11,000 Austro-Sardinians under Field Marshal (FM) Otto Ferdinand von Abensperg und Traun on 8 February 1743. In the Battle of Campo Santo, the Allies forced Spain's army to retreat and abandon Bologna.

In the summer of 1745, the advantage swung toward the Bourbon allies. The Spanish army under Gages captured Novi Ligure and Tortona, while the French army under Marshal Maillebois seized Acqui Terme. In September 1745, the combined Franco-Spanish armies defeated the outnumbered Sardinian army under King Charles Emmanuel III at the Battle of Bassignano. While Maillebois hesitated to move against Piedmont, Elizabeth Farnese insisted that Gages capture Lombardy. On 28 November 1745, the Spanish army crossed the Po River and swiftly conquered Milan. In Lombardy, only the citadel of Milan and Mantua remained in Austrian hands. In Piedmont, the fortress of Alessandria continued to hold out. Maillebois worried that his allies were overextended, but the Spanish authorities were in no mood to listen.

Early in 1746, France made a diplomatic effort to remove Sardinia from its alliance with Austria, but this ended when their truce expired. Sardinian troops suddenly attacked and forced the surrender of the French garrison of Asti on 8 March 1746. At the same time, 30,000 Austrian reinforcements were pouring across the Alps into Italy. Commanded by FM Joseph Wenzel I, Prince of Liechtenstein, the Austrian army expanded to a strength of 45,000 men. As the Spanish position in Lombardy collapsed, Feldmarschall Leutnant (FML) Johann Leopold Bärnklau led an Austrian force to liberate Milan on 20 March. Liechtenstein conducted a clever campaign, seizing Guastalla and Reggio Emilia in April, and forcing the Spanish forces into a small area around Piacenza. Meanwhile, the new Bourbon ally, the Republic of Genoa had its hands full with a revolt in the island of Corsica.

Under strict orders not to withdraw, Don Philip, Gages, and the Spanish army clung to their increasingly isolated position at Piacenza. In May 1746, Liechtenstein moved his 45,000-strong Austrian army into fortified positions south of Piacenza. Though Liechtenstein was in poor health, he was surrounded by competent generals such as Bärnklau, Feldzeugmeister (FZM) Maximilian Ulysses Browne, and FML Franz Leopold von Nádasdy. Maillebois was reluctant to march to Piacenza, but King Louis XV of France ordered him to follow orders from Gages without regard to his own supply line. By 15 June, Maillebois finally complied with his orders and joined Gages' army. The French army counted 15,000 troops, while Gages' Spanish army, which included Genoese and Neapolitan contingents, numbered 25,000. The news that 10,000 Sardinians were about to join the Austrians prompted the Franco-Spanish army to attack. In the Battle of Piacenza on 16 June 1746, the Bourbon army was badly defeated. The Franco-Spanish army lost 7,000 killed and wounded, plus 3,000 prisoners, 8 guns, and 30 colors. The Austrians sustained 3,000 killed and wounded, plus 500 prisoners. (Note: At Piacenza, Bodart credited the Austrians with 40,000 men and the Franco-Spanish with 44,000. (Bodart, p. 208))

== Battle ==
=== Preliminaries ===
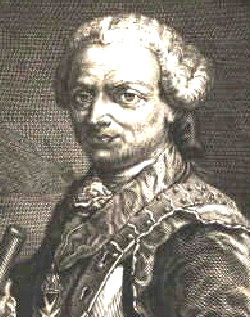
Antoniotto Botta Adorno

On 18 June 1746, the popular Liechtenstein resigned his army command, pleading illness. He was replaced in command of the Austrian forces by FZM Antoniotto Botta Adorno. King Charles Emmanuel assumed command of the combined Austro-Sardinian army, which grew to a strength of 64,000 men. At the urging of Maillebois, the defeated Franco-Spanish army crossed to the north bank of the Po River on 27 June. This placed the Po between the Bourbon army and its natural route of escape, but removed it from Piacenza. The Franco-Spanish army entrenched itself between the Adda and Lambro Rivers and left a 4,000-man garrison under the Marquis of Castellar in Piacenza. Don Philip received news that his father King Philip V had died on 9 July 1746.

Botta Adorno resented the presence of the Bourbon army on the north bank of the Po in Austrian Lombardy. He wished to drive Austria's enemies west into Piedmont. King Charles Emmanuel hated the notion of the Franco-Spanish army violating his kingdom's soil. Browne suggested a diplomatic solution to the impasse. The Austrian and Sardinian armies would remain separate entities, but they would leave one exit route for their enemies to follow in order to get to Genoa. This strategy would allow the allies to expel the Bourbon army without hazarding a major battle. Meanwhile, the Austrians besieged Piacenza, while Charles Emmanuel crossed the Po to put pressure on the Franco-Spanish army.

=== Action ===
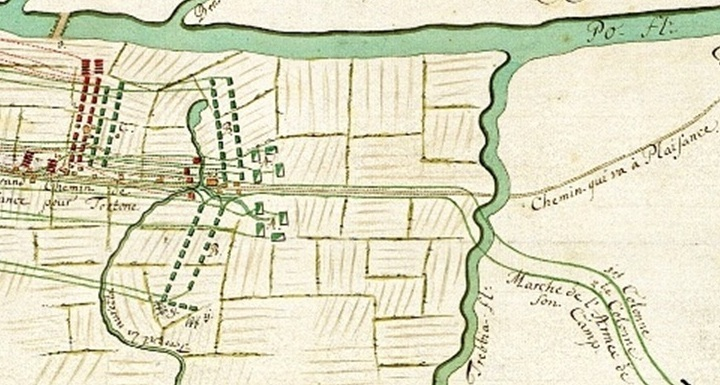
Battle of Rottofreddo, am. A & B: Austrian infantry and cavalry deploy. C: Neuhaus & Gorani attack Bourbon covering force with 6 battalions & 16 grenadier companies. (Note: The map is not clear whether Rottofreno (Rottofreddo) is on the highway near B or near C.)

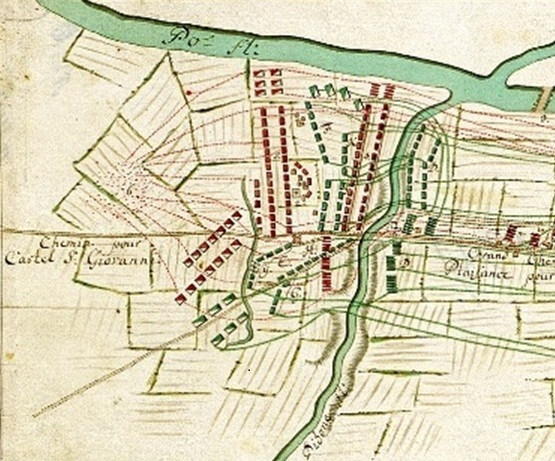
Battle of Rottofreddo, pm. D: Austrians attack Bourbon 2nd position. F: Andrássy & Andlau. E, G, H: Voghtern, Harsch & Méligny. 5: Bourbon 3rd position.

Maillebois guessed the Austro-Sardinian strategy and put a plan into execution on 9 August 1746. The Bourbon army built three bridges across the Po near its confluence with the Tidone River (Note: Cust stated that there were two bridges. (Cust, p. 108)) using boats that were gathered on the Lambro River. Maillebois led the advance guard across to the south bank. The only fighting occurred between the Austrians and the Franco-Spanish. In the initial clash, the Austrian advance guard under Generalfeldwachtmeisters (GMs) Johann Baptiste Serbelloni and Johann Kaspar Neuhaus encountered and drove back three battalions of their adversaries on the main highway between Piacenza and Tortona.

The Bourbon troops formed a line on the north side of the highway. This covered the passage of their artillery across the bridges. This position was attacked by six battalions and 16 grenadier companies led by Neuhaus and GM Johann Gorani. The fighting in this position lasted three hours during which the Austrians captured two guns. At 10:00 am, Botta Adorno's main Austrian army began arriving. The Austrian infantry deployed facing west on both sides of the main highway with their cavalry in the rear and artillery on the left flank.

The Franco-Spanish forces fell back behind the Tidone River where they formed a new battleline on the north side of the highway. By this time, the Austrian Right Wing under Bärnklau was fully committed to the struggle. Bärnklau attempted to outflank the Franco-Spanish line. After two hours of fighting, the Bourbon soldiers fell back from the riverbank and formed a final battleline.

On the Austrian left, the brigade of GM Emmanuel Lorenz Voghtern, supported by the brigades of GMs Ferdinand Philip Harsch and Joseph Méligny, began turning the Franco-Spanish right flank. On the Austrian right, the brigades of GMs Adam Johann Andrássy and Franz Joseph Andlau turned the Bourbon left flank. The second line units held the center of the Austrian line. The final Franco-Spanish line held for five hours before the troops withdrew to Castel San Giovanni. Bärnklau bravely led his soldiers, but during the fighting he was struck and killed by a musket ball. At 4:00 pm, the Bourbon army retreated in much disorder. (Note: It is not possible to reconcile the times given by Cust and the Plan 1746 description. Cust wrote that Serbelloni's battle was going on when Botta Adorno's main army arrived at 10 am and the battle ended at 4 pm, or a span of 6 hours. (Cust, p. 109) Plan 1746 says that the fight to cover the bridge lasted 3 hours, fighting at the Tidone lasted 2 hours, and the final Bourbon stand lasted 5 hours. If Serbelloni's battle includes the fight to cover the bridge, the last two phases were still 7 hours long. (Plan 1746))

== Result ==
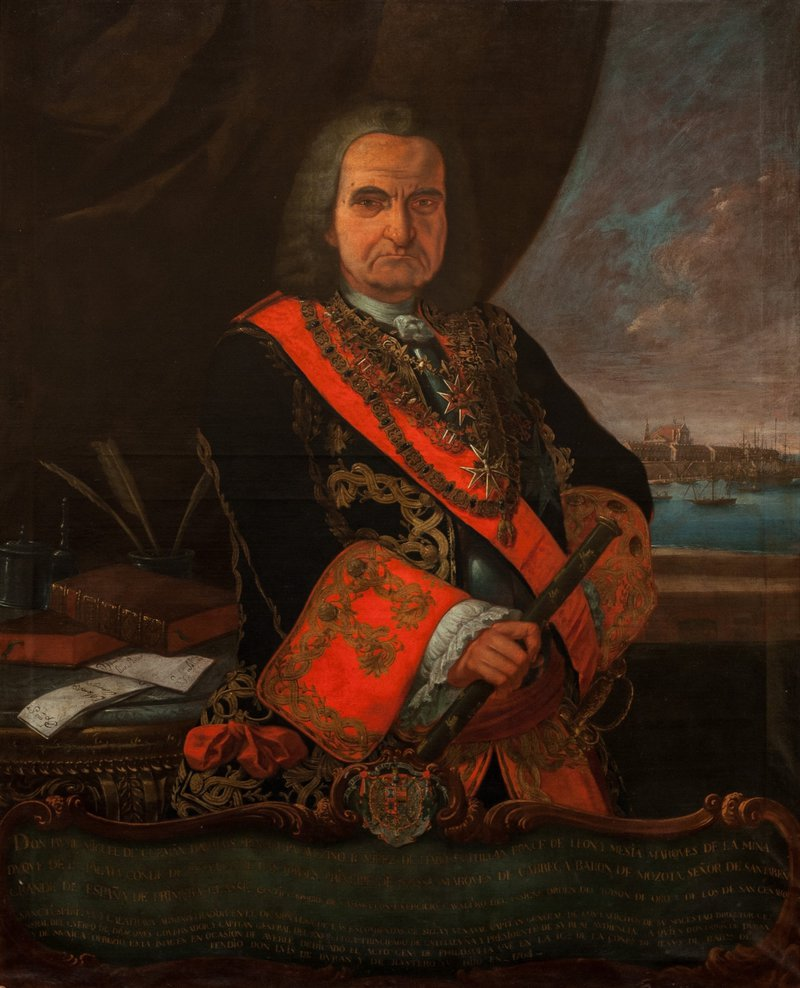
Marquess de La Mina

According to statistician Gaston Bodart, the Franco-Spanish army suffered 6,000 total casualties. There were 1,000 killed and 3,500 wounded, while 1,500 men, 19 guns, and 20 colors were captured. Killed were Spanish Lieutenant General Marquis de Candel and Maestre de campo Conde Diodati, and French Brigadier de Blois. Three general officers were wounded. The Austrian army sustained 3,000 total casualties, including 500 killed, 2,000 wounded, and 500 captured. Aside from Bärnklau killed, four generals were wounded. Edward Cust estimated 8,000 men and 18 guns were lost by the Franco-Spanish army while 4,000 men were casualties from the Austrian army. In the aftermath, Piacenza surrendered to Nádasdy and its garrison became prisoners of war.

On 13 August 1746, Jaime de Guzmán-Dávalos y Spínola, Marquess de La Mina arrived to take over command of the Spanish army from Gages. The next day, the beaten Franco-Spanish army reached Tortona. La Mina announced that his assignment was, "to save the army without exposing a grenadier." When an inferior Austrian pursuit force under Browne got too close, La Mina refused to engage it in battle. Instead, he continued to retreat through the mountains. On 23 August, the Bourbon armies crossed Bocchetta Pass and entered the Republic of Genoa. The panic-stricken Genoese now repented joining the Bourbon alliance in 1745. La Mina made it clear that the Spanish army would not stay to defend Genoa. Without his ally's support, Maillebois reluctantly abandoned Genoa. The Bourbon army retreated as far as Nice on 27 August. The following Austrian invasion of Provence ended in failure.

== Notes ==
Footnotes

Citations
