= Johann Leopold Bärnklau =

Austrian general

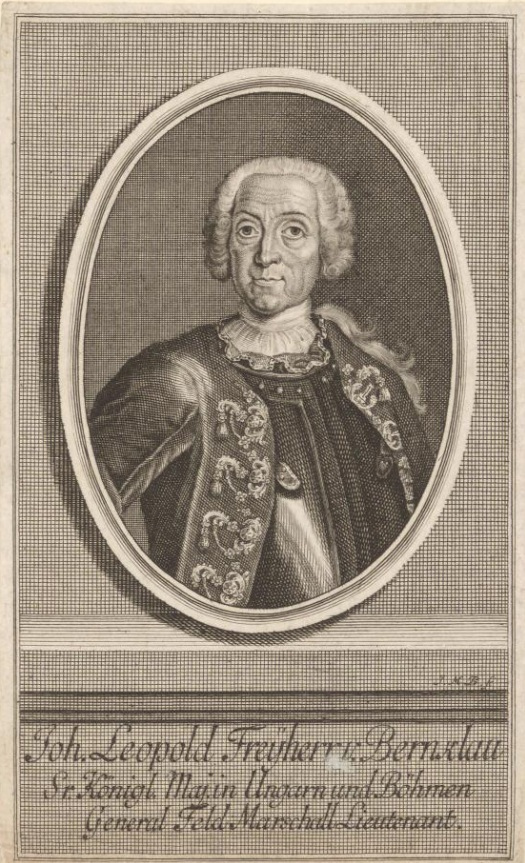
- Johann Leopold Bärnklau zu Schönreith
- Born: 1700; Kluczbork, modern Poland
- Died: 10 August 1746 (aged 45–46) Rottofreno, modern Italy
- Allegiance: Habsburg Monarchy
- Branch: Infantry
- Rank: Feldmarschall-Leutnant
- Conflicts: Austro-Turkish War (1737–1739); Action at Mehadia (1738); Storm of Ujpalanka (1738); Action at Slenza (1739); War of the Austrian Succession; Battle of Schärding (1742); Capture of Munich (1743); Battle of Piacenza (1746); Battle of Rottofreddo (1746)
- Other work: Inhaber Infantry Regiment Nr. 49

Johann Leopold Bärnklau zu Schönreith or Bernklau (1700 – 10 August 1746) became an Austrian general during the Austro-Turkish War (1737–1739) and commander during the War of the Austrian Succession. In the latter war, he fought in Bavaria in 1742–1744, on the Rhine in 1744-1745, and in Italy in 1746. He was killed at the Battle of Rottofreddo. In 1743, he became inhaber (proprietor) of Infantry Regiment Nr. 49 and held the position until his death.

== Early career ==
Johann Leopold Bärnklau was born in 1700 at Kreuzberg (modern Kluczbork) in the Duchy of Brieg. He descended from an old Bohemian family. He was sent to study in Prague but a relative who was a soldier talked Bärnklau into joining the army of Habsburg Austria. The family had military ancestors; one Johann Wilhelm Bärnklau was the colonel commanding the Regal Infantry Regiment Nr. 36 from 1715 to 1724.

In 1734, Bärnklau was promoted colonel commanding Infantry Regiment Nr. 34, assuming command from the original inhaber Ladislaus Kökényesdi de Vettes. He exercised command until 1739 when he was succeeded in command of Kökényesdi Infantry Regiment Nr. 34 by Adam Andrássy de Szent-Király. By age 36, Bärnklau was serving as a colonel on the General Staff. During the Austro-Turkish War, he served with distinction and was given the honor of bringing Empress Anna of Russia the plan of operations against the Ottoman Turks. He defended the pass of Mehadia in 1738 until compelled to make an honorable capitulation. On 16 October 1738, he took part in storming the fort of Ujpalanka. On 29 March 1739, Bärnklau was promoted Generalfeldwachtmeister, which was equivalent to the later rank of Generalmajor. He defeated the Ottomans at Slenza on 21 July 1739.

== War of the Austrian Succession ==
The War of the Austrian Succession began when King Frederick II of Prussia invaded Silesia on 16 December 1740. Within a month, the Prussian army overran the weakly defended Austrian province. The Prussian victory in the Battle of Mollwitz on 10 April 1741 appeared to confirm Austria's loss of Silesia. On 4 June 1741, the Kingdom of France and Electorate of Bavaria joined with Prussia in the coalition against Austria. On 15 July 1741, a Bavarian army led by Elector Charles Albert of Bavaria occupied Passau. Joined by French soldiers, Charles Albert and 18,000 troops seized Linz on 15 September. Soon, the Electorate of Saxony adhered to the alliance, with each state hoping to carve out a slice of Austrian territory. In October, the Franco-Bavarian army suddenly moved north into Bohemia and captured Prague on 25 November 1741.

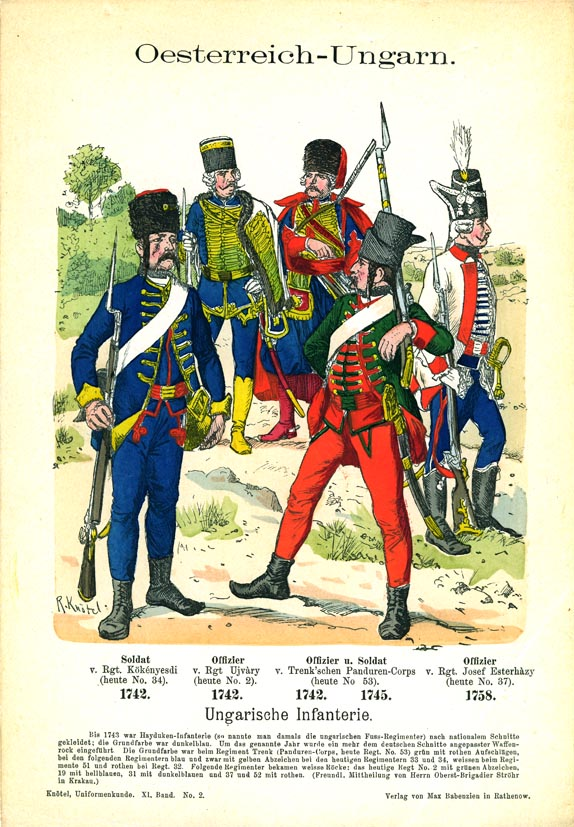
The soldier on the left is from Infantry Regiment Nr. 34, which Bärnklau commanded 1734–1739.

Just when Austria's situation looked hopeless, its ruler Maria Theresa scraped together an army of 16,000 troops led by Ludwig Andreas von Khevenhüller and launched it toward Bavaria on 20 December 1741. Khevenhüller's winter campaign took the Franco-Bavarians by surprise. On 17 January 1742, Bärnklau led a 4,000-man force against 7,000 Bavarians under Ignaz von Toerring in the Battle of Schärding. The Bavarians were compelled to make a hasty retreat. According to David G. Chandler, the victorious Austrians (led by Schönreith) suffered a costly 1,000 casualties while the Bavarians sustained 650 casualties, including 500 prisoners. The 10,000 Franco-Bavarians holding Linz found themselves surrounded. On 24 January, Khevenhüller allowed them to go free in exchange for abandoning Linz when their commander Henri François, comte de Ségur threatened to burn down the city. Bärnklau captured Munich on 14 February. The Austrians pulled out of Munich on 28 April, but reoccupied it on 6 May. Bärnklau was promoted Feldmarschall Leutnant on 13 February 1742.

In September 1742, Khevenhüller's army was redeployed from Bavaria to Bohemia, leaving only 5,000 troops behind. The Bavarian army took the opportunity to recapture Munich and all of Bavaria except Schärding. In May 1743, a major Austrian army began advancing into Bavaria. On 9 June, Bärnklau retook Munich as part of this campaign which seized most of Bavaria. On 27 June 1743, a convention was reached between Khevenhüller and the Bavarian Friedrich Heinrich von Seckendorff, temporarily taking Bavaria out of its French alliance. Bärnklau captured a Frenchman named La Croix and his partisan corps. He was entrusted with the command of occupied Bavaria. In 1743, Bärnklau was appointed inhaber of Infantry Regiment Nr. 49, succeeding Otto Walsegg. Carl Gustav von Kheul became inhaber of the regiment in 1747. The Starhemberg Infantry Regiment Nr. 24 was serving with the Bärnklau Corps in Bavaria in 1744.

In the fall of 1744, Seckendorff led 32,000 Franco-German troops to recover Bavaria. The Austrians did not have the strength to oppose this onslaught. Bärnklau retreated across the Inn River on 17 October and gave up Bavaria again. Austria offered Bavaria a peace treaty in early 1745, but the Bavarians hesitated. Under the command of Károly József Batthyány with subordinates Bärnklau and Maximilian Ulysses Browne, the Austrian army invaded Bavaria on 21 March 1745 and quickly forced the electorate to conclude a peace treaty. Later, Bärnklau was transferred to the Rhine where he captured the island of Kühkopf and held it until relieved by Batthyány. In 1746, Bärnklau was ordered to join the army in Italy.

== Italian campaign and death ==
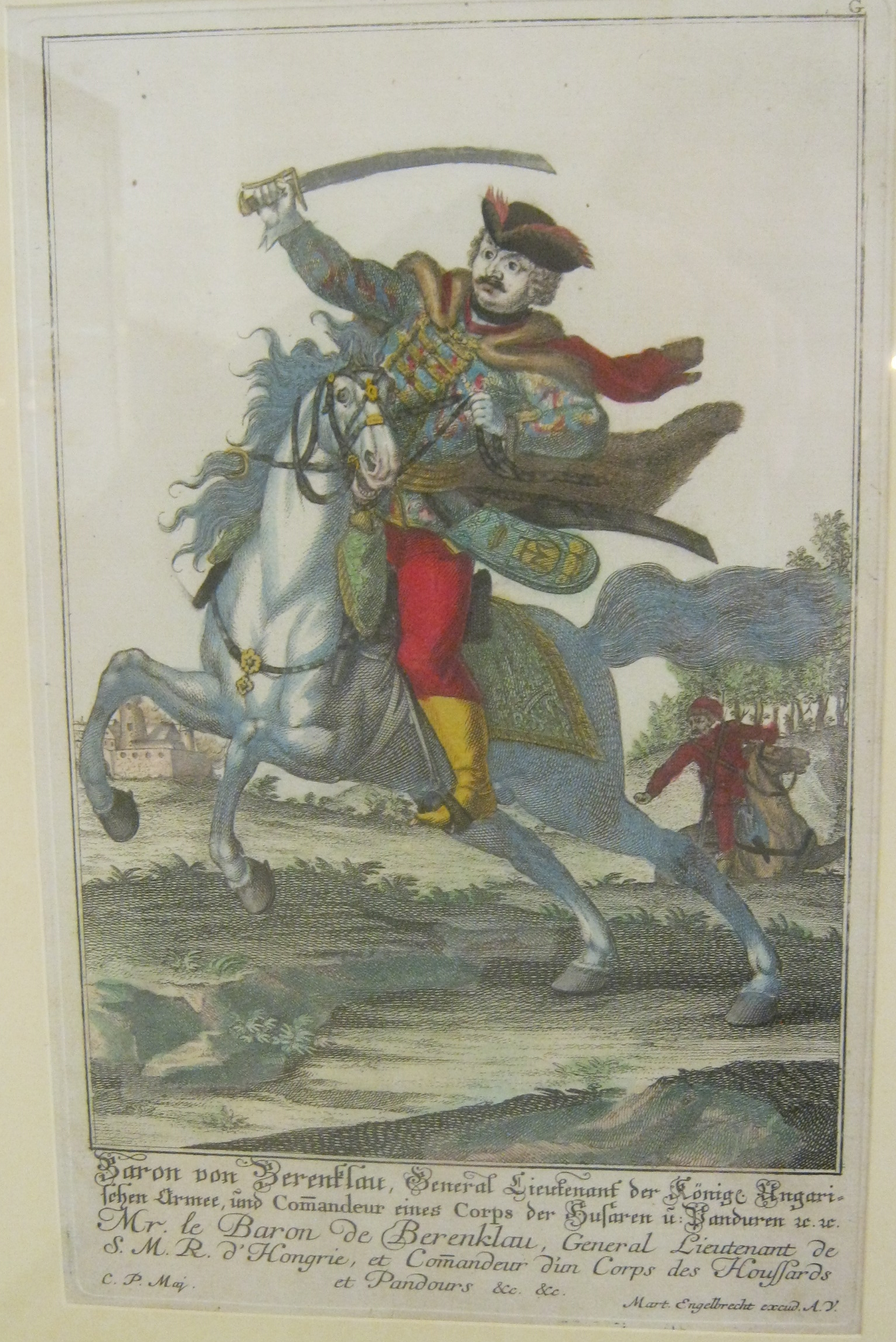
Johann Leopold Bärnklau

In the fall of 1745, the Franco-Spanish forces had emerged victorious in Italy, seizing Milan. However, the tide turned in early 1746 when the Kingdom of Sardinia scored a victory over the French and Austria added 30,000 reinforcements to its Italian army. On 20 March 1746, Bärnklau led an Austrian force that reoccupied Milan. The Austrian army prepared to face the Franco-Spanish forces that gathered at Piacenza for the showdown battle. The 45,000-strong Austrian army was commanded by Joseph Wenzel I, Prince of Liechtenstein. Opposed to the Austrians were a Spanish army of 25,000 men under Jean Thierry du Mont, comte de Gages and a French army of 15,000 led by Jean-Baptiste François des Marets, marquis de Maillebois. Since 10,000 Sardinians were coming to reinforce the Austrians, Gages and Maillebois decided to attack before they arrived.

On 16 June 1746, the Franco-Spanish army moved south from Piacenza to start the Battle of Piacenza. Maillebois and his French soldiers tried to outflank the Austrian left wing under Browne while Gages and the Spanish troops frontally attacked the Austrian right wing under Antoniotto Botta Adorno. Browne anticipated Maillebois' maneuver and placed his men behind a canal where they repulsed French assaults. When Browne's men counterattacked, the French soldiers were forced to retreat. On the Austrian right, the Spanish assault slowly gained ground until Bärnklau led the Austrian cavalry into battle. By 2:00 pm, the battle was over and the Austrians were victorious. The winners sustained 3,400 casualties while Spanish losses numbered 9,000 and French losses were 4,000.

On 18 June 1746, Liechtenstein resigned his command because of illness, and Botta Adorno assumed leadership of the Austrians while King Charles Emmanuel III took command of the combined Austro-Sardinian army. The now isolated Franco-Spanish army escaped to the north bank of the Po River on 27 June. The army recrossed to the south bank of the Po on 9 August. The Austro-Sardinians attacked the Franco-Spanish army's rearguard in the Battle of Rottofreddo. After a brawling fight that lasted from morning until 4:00 pm, the army of Maillebois and Gages broke free and escaped to Tortona. The 4,000-man garrison of Piacenza surrendered to the Austrians after the battle. The Franco-Spanish army lost 8,000 men and 18 guns in the combat while the Austrians sustained 4,000 casualties, including Bärnklau killed. Bärnklau was struck down by a musket ball during the struggle on 10 August 1746.

== Notes ==
Military offices
Preceded by Ladislaus Kökényesdi de Vettes	Oberst (Colonel) of Infantry Regiment Nr. 23; 1734–1739	Succeeded by Adam Andrássy de Szent-Király
Preceded by Otto Walsegg	Proprietor (Inhaber) of Infantry Regiment Nr. 49; 1743–1746	Succeeded by Carl Gustav von Kheul
