= Battle of Piacenza =

1746 battle during the War of the Austrian Succession

Coordinates: 45.063°N 9.693°E

Battle of Piacenza (1746)
- Part of the War of the Austrian Succession
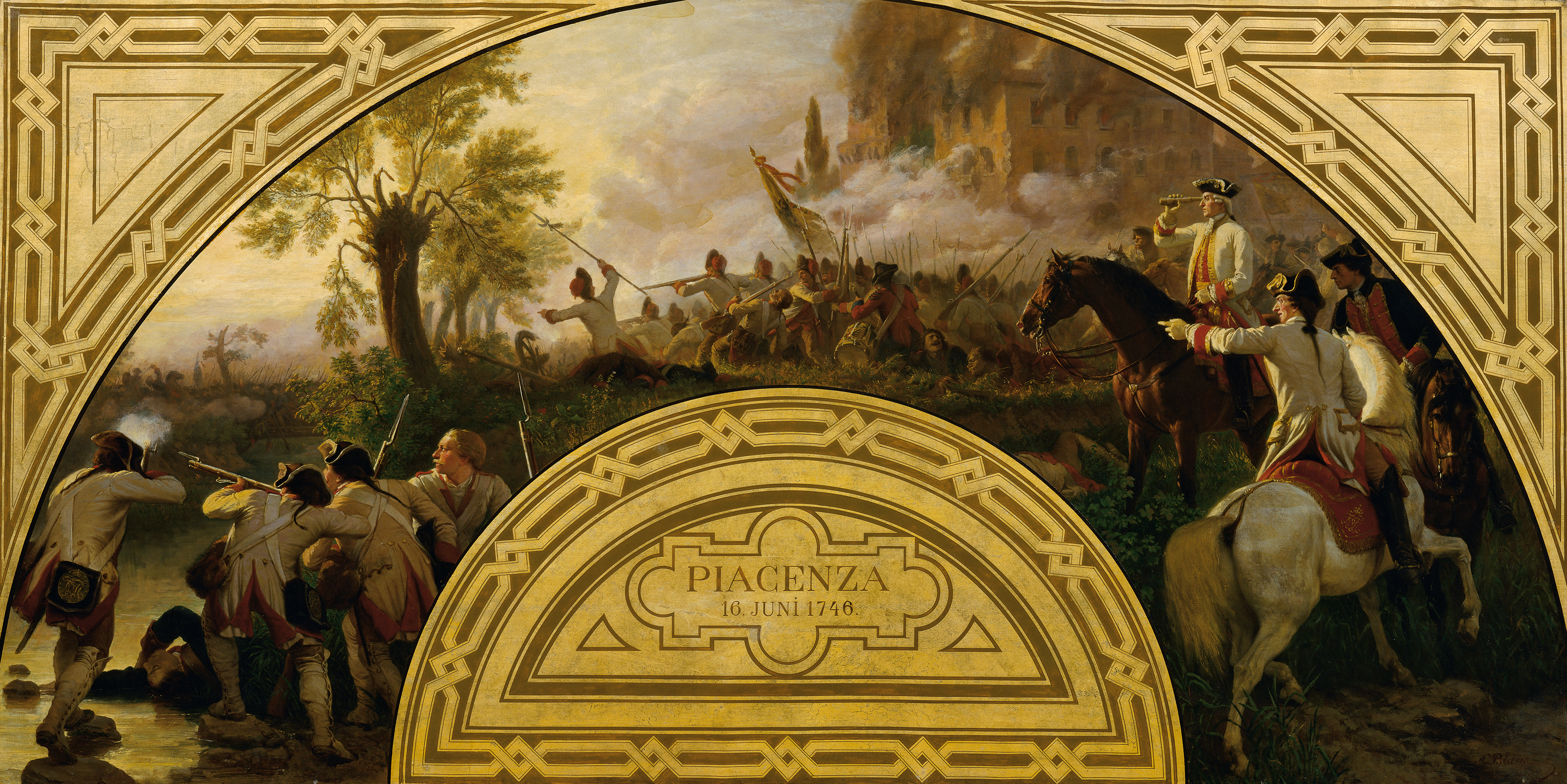
- The battle at Piacenza in 1746; painting by Karl von Blaas (Museum: Belvedere)
Date	16 June 1746
Location	Piacenza, Italy
Result	Austrian victory

Belligerents
Habsburg Austria	Kingdom of Spain; Kingdom of France; Kingdom of Naples; Republic of Genoa

Commanders and leaders
(Habsburg monarchy) Prince Liechtenstein (Habsburg monarchy) Count Botta Adorno (Habsburg monarchy) Maximilian Browne	(Spain) Count of Gages (Kingdom of France) Marquis Maillebois

Strength
40,000–45,000	40,000–44,000 • 25,000 Spanish & allies • 15,000 French

Casualties and losses
3,400–3,500	10,000–15,000, 10 guns

The Battle of Piacenza or Battle of St. Lazaro (16 June 1746) was fought between an Austrian army and a Bourbon army near Piacenza, in Northern Italy during the War of the Austrian Succession. The Bourbon army consisted of a large Spanish force commanded by Jean Bonaventure du Mont, comte de Gages and a somewhat smaller French corps led by Jean-Baptiste Francois des Marets, marquis de Maillebois. Gages' command included allied Neapolitan and Genoese soldiers. The Austrian army was commanded by Josef Wenzel, Prince of Liechtenstein. The Bourbon generals determined to attack because the Austrians were about to be reinforced by a Sardinian corps. The Franco-Spanish assault was anticipated by the Austrian generals and it failed with heavy losses. The defeat caused the Bourbon army to retreat to Genoa, though it had to fight its way out at the subsequent Battle of Rottofreddo. Louis-Joseph de Montcalm was among the notable French combatants.

== Background ==
On 16 December 1740, the Kingdom of Prussia invaded and overran Silesia, a province of Habsburg Austria. This event started the War of the Austrian Succession. Aggressive diplomacy by the Kingdom of France lured the Electorate of Bavaria and the Electorate of Saxony into the anti-Austrian alliance. On 15 September 1741, a Franco-Bavarian army captured Linz. Prague was captured by a Franco-Bavarian-Saxon army on 25 November 1741. With most of Austria's army committed to the war north of the Alps, King Philip V of Spain and his Queen Elizabeth Farnese aimed to grab Habsburg territory in Italy for their son Don Philip. Avoiding an understrength British naval squadron, Spain landed 14,000 troops in Italy in November 1741 and 12,800 more in January 1742. This menacing move drove a wavering Kingdom of Sardinia into alliance with Austria. After ten months of inconclusive campaigning, 13,000 Spanish under Jean Thierry du Mont, comte de Gages fought 11,000 Austro-Sardinians under Field Marshal (FM) Otto Ferdinand von Abensperg und Traun on 8 February 1743. In the Battle of Campo Santo, the Allies compelled Spain's army to abandon Bologna and fall back to Rimini.

An Austrian attempt led by Johann Georg Christian, Prince of Lobkowicz to conquer Naples was repelled at the Second Battle of Velletri on 10–11 August 1744. That year, a 33,000-man Franco-Spanish army invaded Piedmont from the southwest. The Bourbon allies defeated Sardinian King Charles Emmanuel III at the Battle of Madonna dell'Olmo on 30 September 1744. Nevertheless, the attempted siege of Cuneo failed when Sardinian resistance and the weather compelled the Franco-Spanish army to retreat. The Bourbon allies' 1745 attempt to penetrate Piedmont from the southwest proved more successful. The Spanish army under Gages captured Novi in June and Tortona in August. The French under Jean-Baptiste Francois des Marets, marquis de Maillebois seized Acqui in July. A Spanish corps also seized Piacenza, Parma, and Pavia. With 50,000 troops, the Franco-Spanish allies defeated Charles Emmanuel's 30,000 men at the Battle of Bassignano on 27 September 1745.

== Operations ==
=== Bourbon expansion ===
King Charles Emmanuel III

After Bassignano, the French government decided to reduce its Italian commitment. On the other hand, Elizabeth Farnese demanded that her Spanish generals capture Milan. She got her way on 28 November 1745 when Gages led the Spanish army across the Po River. Outnumbered, the Austrian commander Josef Wenzel, Prince of Liechtenstein abandoned Milan. The city was occupied by the Spanish on 16 December and Don Philip promptly declared himself king. By the end of 1745, Austrian troops were absent from Lombardy except for garrisons in Mantua and the Milan citadel. Maillebois foresaw that his ally was overextended, but Don Philip and the Spanish government were not listening.

The Treaty of Dresden, signed on 25 December 1745, ended the conflict between Prussia, Austria, and Saxony known as the Second Silesian War. This led King Charles Emmanuel and his advisors to hope that Austria would soon transfer troops to Italy. In order to buy time for this to happen, the Kingdom of Sardinia signaled that it was ready to open talks with the French. In fact, the Habsburg Queen Maria Theresa immediately ordered Maximilian Ulysses Browne and 10,000 Austrians to march from Heidelberg to Italy. The French diplomat René Louis de Voyer de Paulmy, Marquis of Argenson began to negotiate with Charles Emmanuel in the hope of detaching Piedmont from its alliance with Austria. The two parties agreed that the truce would expire at the end of February 1746, if no agreement was reached. The gullible Argenson even insisted that Maillebois suspend the siege of Alessandria on 17 February in order to show France's good faith. The Spanish monarchs did not trust the Sardinian king and tried unsuccessfully to bribe Argenson to stop the talks.

=== Bourbon retreat ===
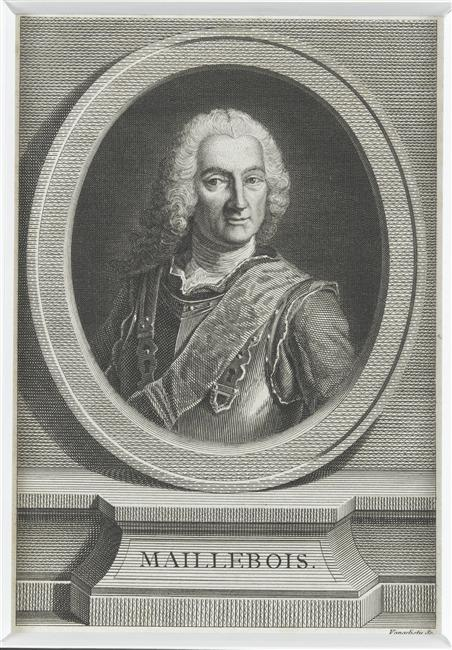
Marshal Maillebois

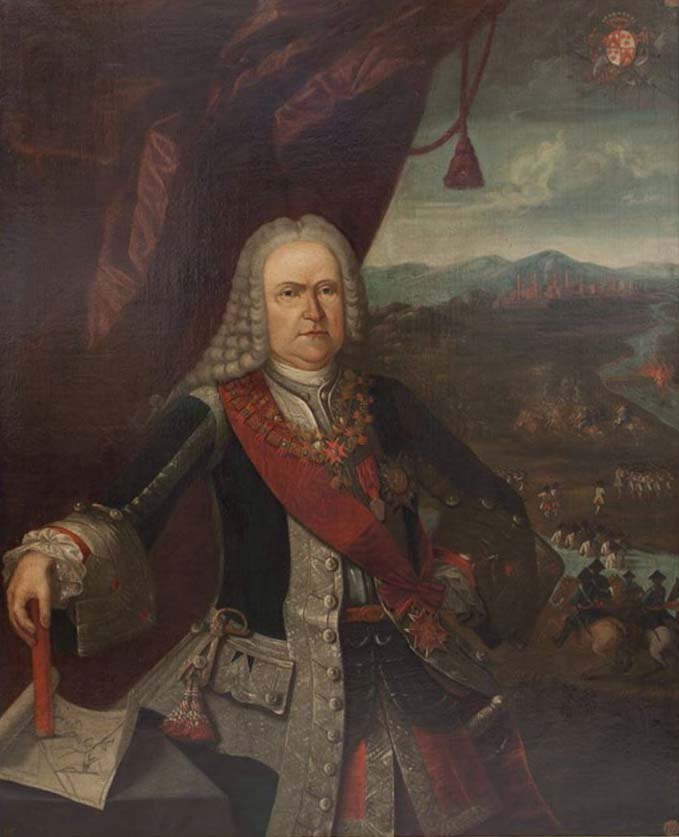
Count Jean de Gages

On 1 March 1746, the deadline expired and Charles Emmanuel secretly resumed the war; his troops began to move towards the French positions. On 5 March 1746, the Sardinian army under Karl Sigmund Friedrich Wilhelm Leutrum von Ertingen launched an attack on Asti, taking its French garrison by surprise. Three days later, the 5,000-man garrison surrendered after Asti's walls were breached in two places. Fearful of being cut off from Genoa and France, Maillebois evacuated the Tanaro valley and withdrew to Novi. The Sardinians soon recaptured Casale and Valenza. The Spanish authorities were furious with Argenson, who at least admitted his blunder. Austrian numbers in Italy were bolstered by 30,000 soldiers transferred from Germany across the Alps to Italy. This reinforcement raised the Austro-Sardinian army to a total of 76,000 troops.

The surrender of Asti caused French morale to plummet and within a month the army of Maillebois lost 15,000 men to desertion, illness or capture. Gages' Spanish army sat still at Piacenza, uncertain of what course of action to take in the face of the new danger caused by the Austrian concentration. Under orders from the Spanish monarchs to hold Milan, Don Philip also sat immobilized. The 45,000-strong Austrian army advanced adroitly to enfold its opponents. Its commander, Prince Liechtenstein was accompanied by the veteran generals Browne, Franz Leopold von Nádasdy, and Johann Leopold Bärnklau. Don Philip abandoned Milan and escaped to Pavia. On 20 March 1746, Bärnklau's troops retook Milan and laid a heavy hand on the territory of Cremona. Another Austrian column seized Guastalla and the Marquis of Castellar's Spanish soldiers were forced to abandon Parma. Reggio was also taken by the Austrians by the end of April. The Austrians concentrated at Parma while the various components of Gages' army gathered at Piacenza.

Gages and Don Philip were under categorical orders from the Spanish monarchs to hold onto Piacenza. To demonstrate Bourbon cooperation, King Louis XV instructed Maillebois to follow Don Philip's orders regardless of his line of communication. The Austrians were surprised that their Bourbon foes clung to Piacenza rather than retreating to Genoa. In May 1746, though Liechtenstein suffered from poor health, his army took a position south of Piacenza and began fortifying it. Since the fortifications of Piacenza were in poor condition, Gages encamped his army on the glacis and constructed his own field works. Gages' 25,000 troops included Genoese and Neapolitan contingents that suffered particularly from disease. Desertions and sickness among his Spanish troops also took their toll. Earlier, Gages asked assistance from Maillebois, but the French commander put off his request by only sending ten battalions while keeping the bulk of his forces at Novi. Only after receiving direct orders from Louis XV, did Maillebois finally concentrate 15,000 French troops near Piacenza, with the last soldiers arriving on 14–15 June.

== Battle ==
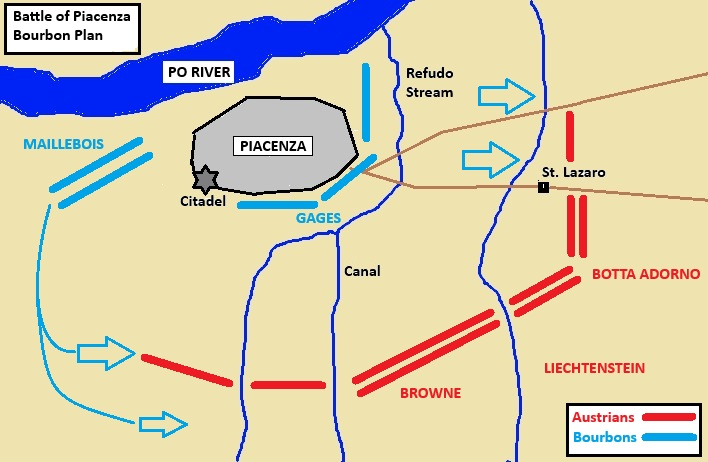
Battle of Piacenza 1746 - Bourbon Plan

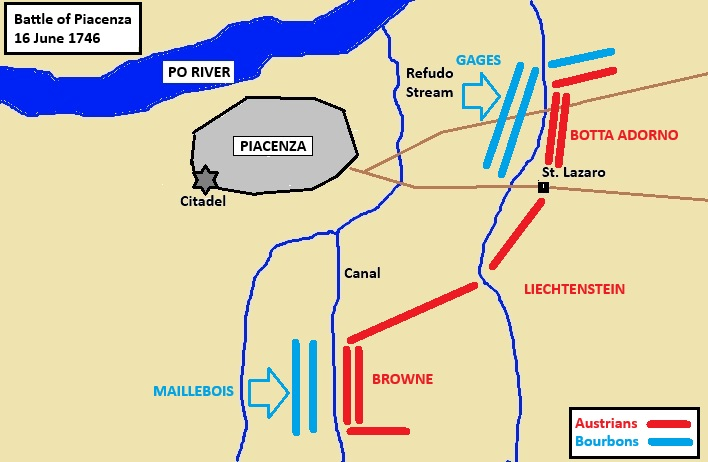
Battle of Piacenza 16 June 1746 - Actual positions

According to historian Reed Browning, the Austrians enjoyed a manpower advantage of 45,000 men against 40,000 Bourbons and allied troops. A Sardinian force numbering 10,000 men followed Maillebois and was expected to reinforce the Austrian army. Since this would give Liechtenstein a 15,000-man advantage, Maillebois convinced Gages to order an immediate attack. Gages, who had time to carefully observe his enemy's positions, planned to hold the Austrian center in place with an artillery bombardment while assaulting both of his opponent's flanks. The Bourbon right flank was ordered to outflank the Austrian left flank while sending a column on a wider sweep to hit its rear. Meanwhile, the Bourbon left was directed to strike the Austrian right flank in order to bend it back toward the center. Statistician Gaston Bodart credited the Austrians with 40,000 soldiers, including 33,000 infantry and 7,000 cavalry. Bodart stated that the Franco-Spanish army numbered 44,000, including 42,000 infantry and 2,000 cavalry.

On the night of the 15–16 June 1746, the Bourbon forces began to marshal for battle. Unfortunately for them, the Austrian left flank commander Browne guessed what his opponents intended and wheeled his left-most units back so that they were behind a canal. Antoniotto Botta Adorno commanded the Austrian right and simply put his troops on the alert. At dawn on 16 June, the Austrian artillery opened fire on the Bourbon camp. The French troops advancing to outflank the Austrian left found themselves unexpectedly making a frontal attack against Browne's defenders. Maillebois was so shocked that he suspected a spy had betrayed Gages' plans. The French column that was supposed to strike the Austrian rear lost its way and instead joined the rest of Maillebois' forces. Maillebois strove mightily to get all his troops into action, but when the French infantry tried to charge across the canal, they were defeated by intense musket and cannon fire. After beating back the French assaults, Browne's defenders counterattacked and French morale collapsed. Maillebois attempted to rally his soldiers by grasping a flag, but it was to no avail. By noon, the French were in retreat.

On the other flank, Gages' Spanish troops advanced right up to the Austrian lines in a frontal assault. After repeated attacks the Spanish began gaining ground against the Austrian right flank. The Spanish infantry bravely pressed forward but their lack of cavalry proved to be decisive. At the critical moment, Bärnklau led the Austrian cavalry into the fight. The cavalry charge threw the Spanish troops into confusion and they began to fall back. Despite the repulse, Gages organized an orderly retreat to Piacenza. This occurred just in time because the approaching Sardinian force heard the sounds of battle and hurried their march. However, they were not in time to engage in the battle. By 2:00 pm, the battle was over and the Austrian victory was complete. When Don Philip saw that the battle was turning against the Bourbon forces, he fled into Piacenza.

== Aftermath ==
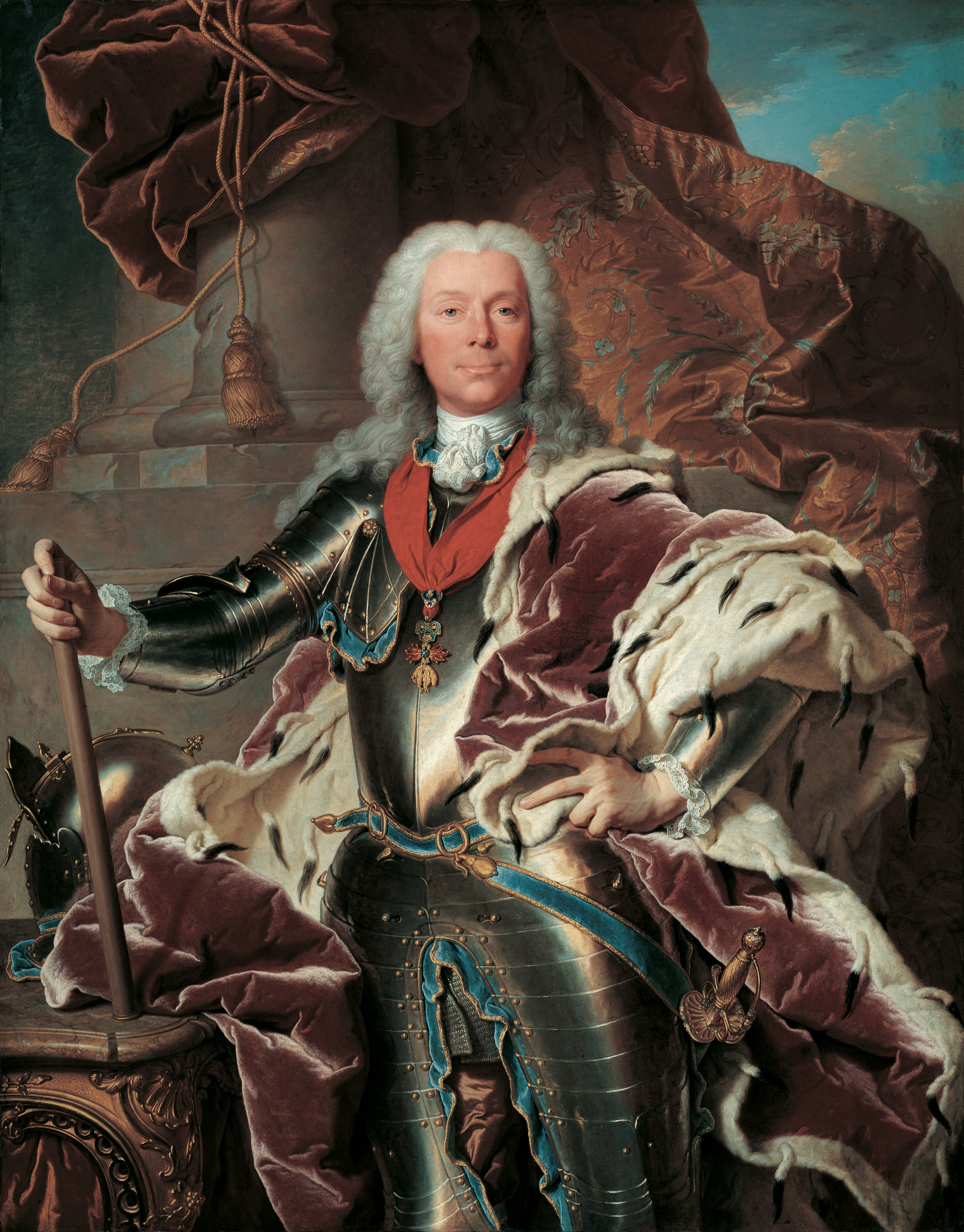
Prince Liechtenstein

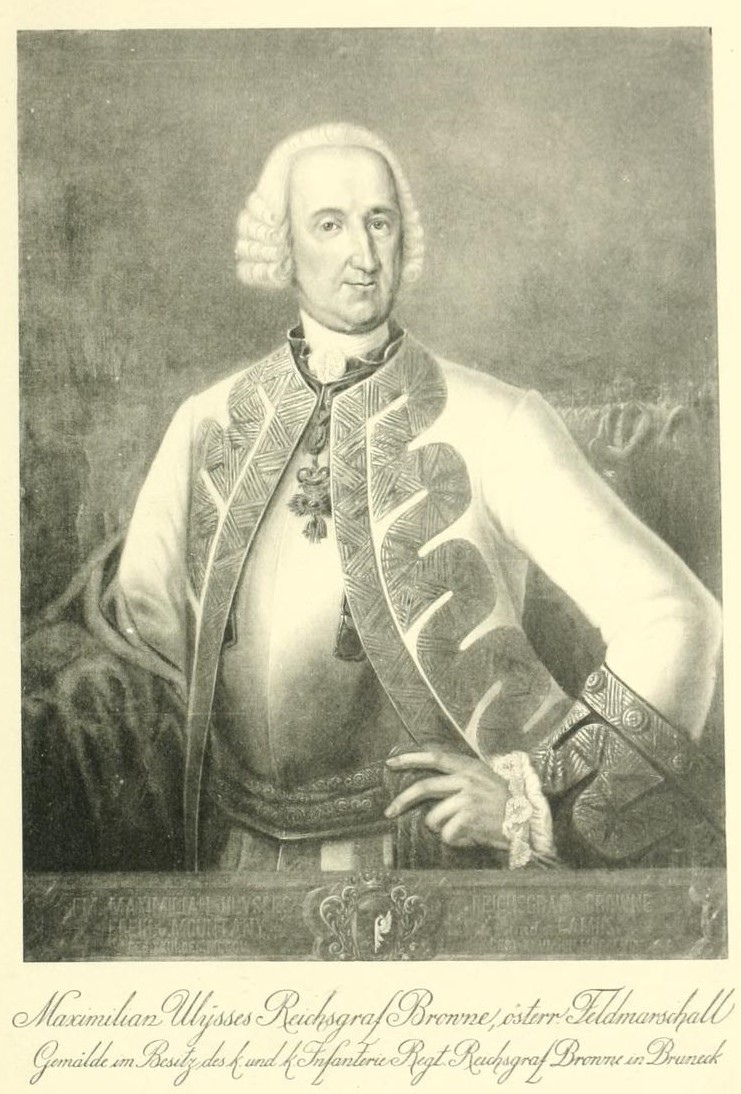
Maximilian Browne

According to Browning, the Austrian army sustained 3,400 casualties including 700 dead. The Spanish army suffered 9,000 casualties while the French lost 4,000, for a total of 13,000 casualties. The Franco-Spanish army lost about 4,500 soldiers killed and 4,800 taken prisoner. Edward Cust stated that the Franco-Spanish lost 6,000 killed, 9,000 wounded, 60 colors, and 10 artillery pieces. Cust did not list Austrian losses. Bodart asserted that the Austrians lost 3,000 killed and wounded, plus 500 captured. Their Bourbon opponents lost 7,000 killed and wounded, plus 3,000 men, 8 cannons, and 30 colors captured. The following general officers were killed: French Mestres de camp Borstell and Comte Tessé, French Brigadier Marquis de Lescure, and Spanish Brigadiers Conde du Chais and Don Romei. French Colonel Louis-Joseph de Montcalm, who later defended New France, was wounded by five saber cuts and captured while trying to rally his troops.

Queen Maria Theresa remarked, "I want to hope that this event will dispel from my enemies any thought they may have of completely banishing me from Italy." The Spanish ambassador to France, Fernando de Silva, 12th Duke of Alba (also known as the Duke of Huéscar) wrote, "The operation was lost for being badly conceived and badly managed." Gages' critics argued that he failed to commit enough cavalry to the battle. On 18 June 1746, Liechtenstein sent Maria Theresa his resignation due to his illness and Botta Adorno assumed command of the Austrian army. The arrival of the Sardinian king meant that Charles Emmanuel took command of the combined Austro-Sardinian army. On 27 June, the 25,000 remaining soldiers of the Franco-Spanish army crossed to the north bank of the Po River. This movement placed the Bourbon army on the wrong side of the river if their aim was to retreat to Genoa. A 4,000-man garrison was left in Piacenza under the Marquis of Castellar.

The Austro-Sardinian allies had differing objectives. Botta Adorno wanted to rid Lombardy of the Bourbon army by pushing it west into Piedmont, but Charles Emmanuel did not want the Franco-Spanish soldiers on his kingdom's territory. Rather than trying to force a showdown battle, Browne argued that the allies should provide an escape route in order to rid northern Italy of the Bourbon army. Maillebois guessed his opponent's strategy. On 9 August 1746, the Bourbon army bridged the Po, crossed to its south bank, and marched west. In the Battle of Rottofreddo the next day, the Franco-Spanish held off Botta Adorno's Austrian army in a costly rearguard action. Castellar surrendered Piacenza soon afterward. Bodart stated that the Austrians sustained 3,000 casualties while inflicting 6,000 casualties on the Franco-Spanish and capturing 19 cannons and 20 colors.

The Bourbon army reached Tortona on 14 August 1746. By that time, Jaime de Guzmán-Dávalos y Spínola, Marquess de La Mina had replaced Gages as commander. The Franco-Spanish army retreated through Bocchetta Pass on 23 August and Genoa surrendered to the Austrians 6 September. Nice was captured by the Austro-Sardinians on 17 October as the 17,000 Bourbon survivors retreated into France. With Charles Emmanuel incapacitated with smallpox, Browne commanded 30,000 Austro-Sardinians at the French border. The attempt to exploit the victory by invading Provence at the end of the year ended in failure. Botta Adorno's harsh measures imposed on captured Genoa backfired when the Genoese inhabitants rose in revolt and drove out their Austrian occupiers.

== Commentary ==
Historian Reed Browning wrote, "Few would have suspected it that day, but in fact the question of domination in Lombardy had now been effectively answered for the next half century." Author Jeremy Black stated that the battle of Piacenza, "ended Bourbon hopes of overrunning northern Italy and set the territorial pattern of the peninsula until the French Revolutionary Wars."
