= Battle of Bassignana =

The Battle of Bassignana may refer to any of the following battles.

- Battle of Bassignano (1745), during the War of the Austrian Succession
- Battle of Bassignana (1799), during the French Revolutionary Wars
