= Palazzo Botta Adorno =

Neoclassical-style palace in Pavia, Lombardy, Italy

Coordinates: 45.18814°N 9.15084°E

Palazzo Botta
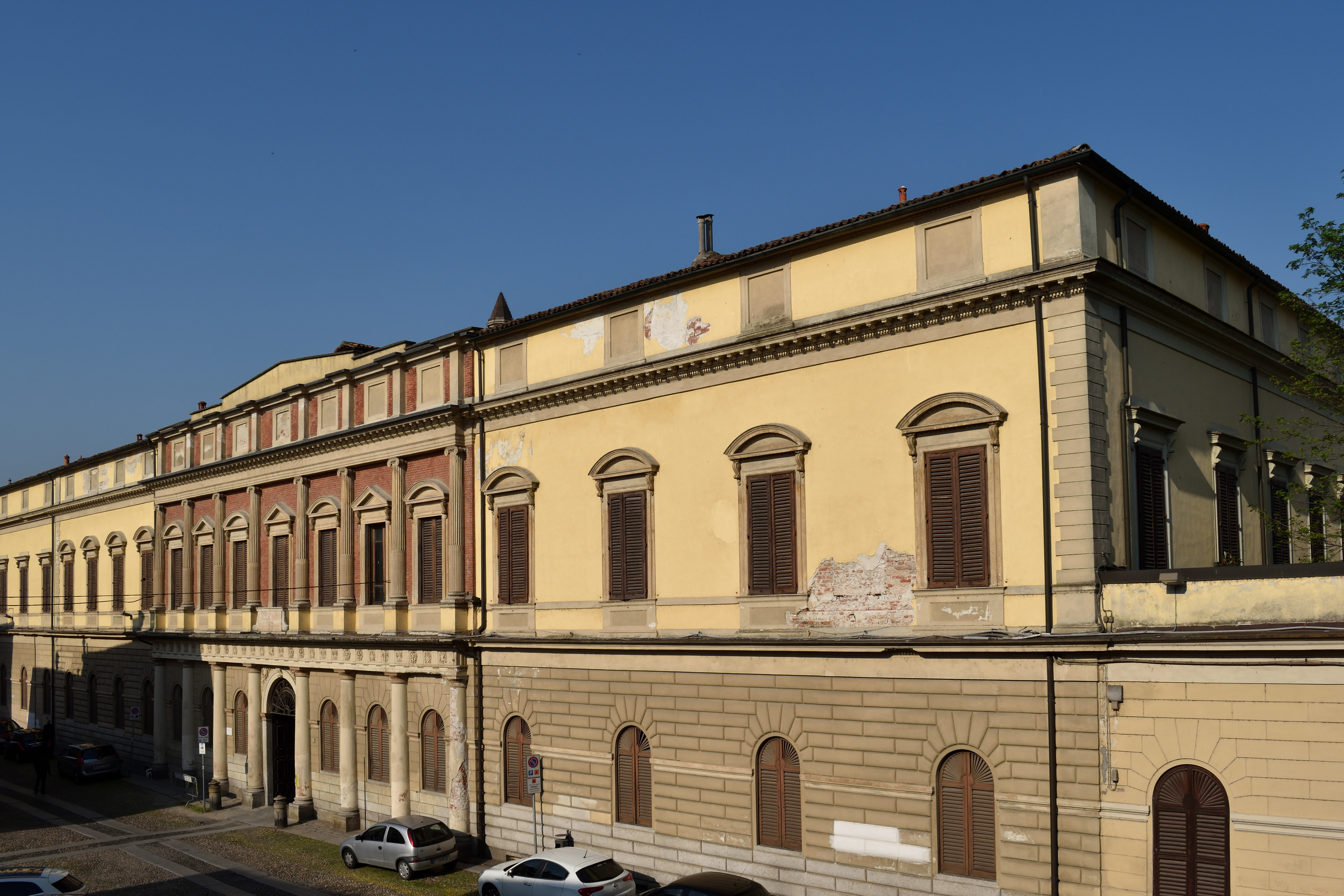
- Facade
- Interactive map of the Palazzo Botta area

General information
- Type: Palace
- Architectural style: Rococo
- Location: Pavia, Italy
- Owner: University of Pavia

The Palazzo Botta or Botta Adorno is a Neoclassical-style palace with a long facade along Via Lanfranco and Piazza Botta Adorno Antoniotto in the town of Pavia, region of Lombardy, Italy. Once the family home of the aristocratic Botta family, it presently houses the Natural History Museum of Pavia and the Museum Camillo Golgi.

== History ==
The site once was a collection of houses and properties that during the 15th-century came under the ownership of the Beccaria family, later the Campeggi family, but by 1630–1650 had been occupied by the Botta family, under Francesca Beccaria Botta. This family joined with the Adorno family, a prominent noble family of Genoa.
In 1693, Luigi Botta Adorno began a reconstruction including the rich interior decoration completed over the next century. The piano nobile has a number of ceiling frescoes attributed to Giuseppe Natali. The Botta family included the poet Alessandro Botta; Giacomo Botta Adorno, a field-marshal for the Hapsburg empire; and Antoniotto Botta Adorno (1688–1774), a general for Eugene of Savoy and later the Hapsburg, and plenipotentiary in the Netherlands for the Holy Roman Empire.

In the eighteenth and nineteenth centuries the building, considered one of the most beautiful palaces in Pavia, welcomed and hosted many famous people: King Philip V of Spain in 1702, Maria Luisa of Spain in 1765, in 1805 Napoleon stayed here with his wife Joséphine, Emperor Francis II stayed there in 1816, who also returned in June 1825, Emperor Ferdinand I in 1838 and then Marshal Radetzky, King Charles Albert in 1848 and, finally, Victor Emmanuel II in 1859.

In 1887, after the last descendant of the Botta Adorno family died, the heir the Marquis Cusani Visconti sold the palace to the university. Starting in the 1890s, the university began moving its institutes of anatomy, physiology, hygiene, and physiology to this site.

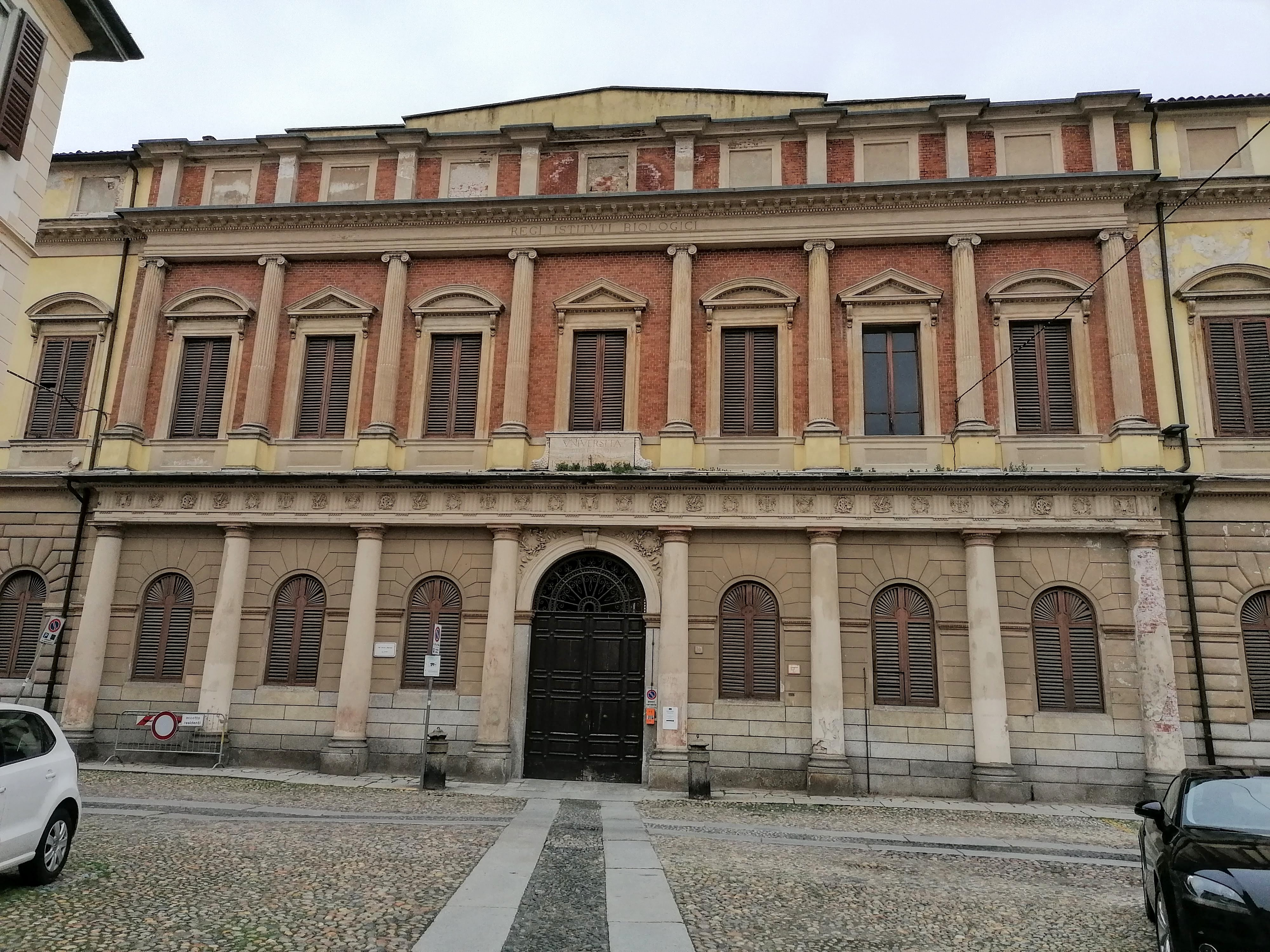
The central part of the facade.

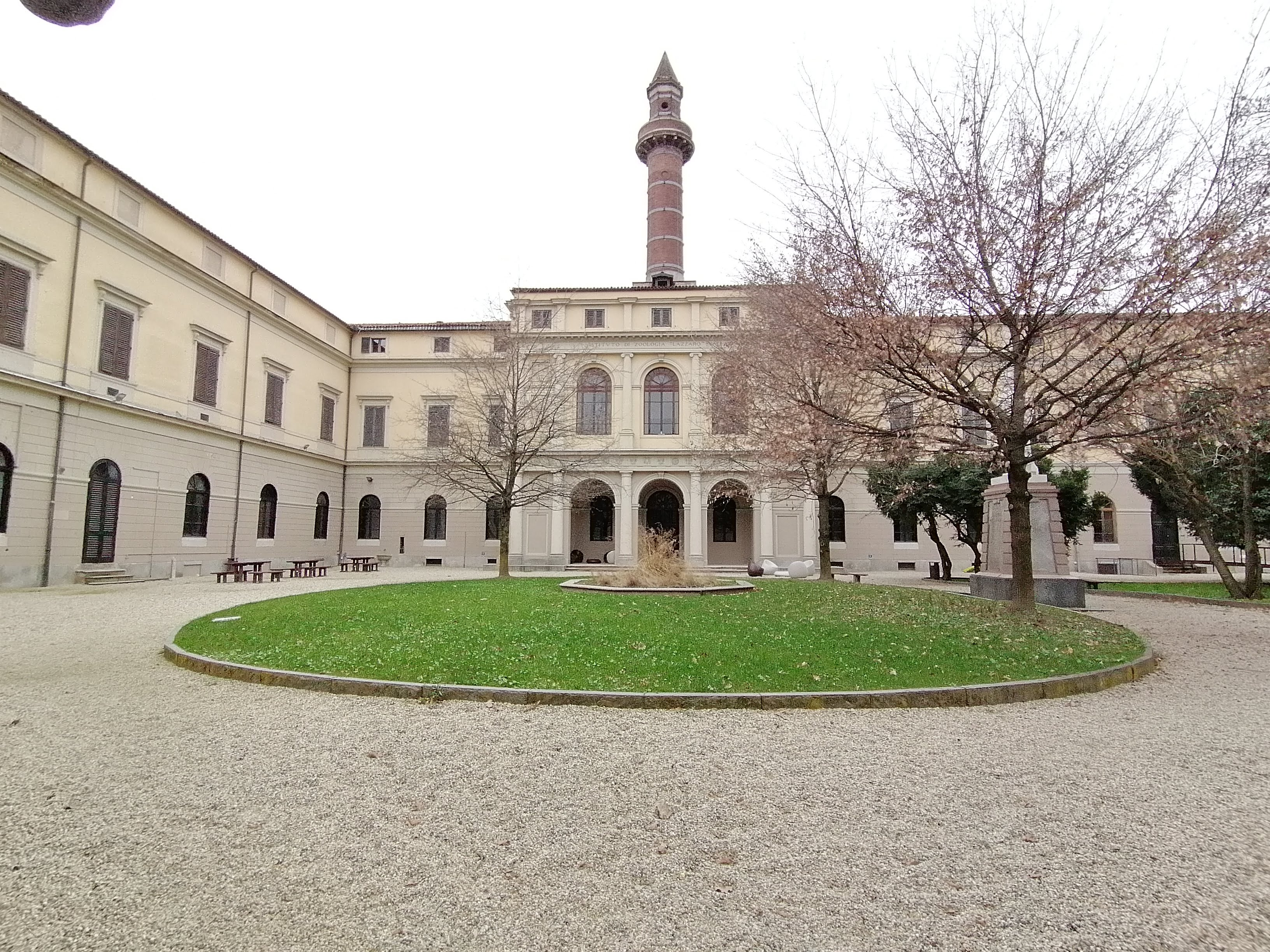
The entrance to the Natural History Museum of Pavia.

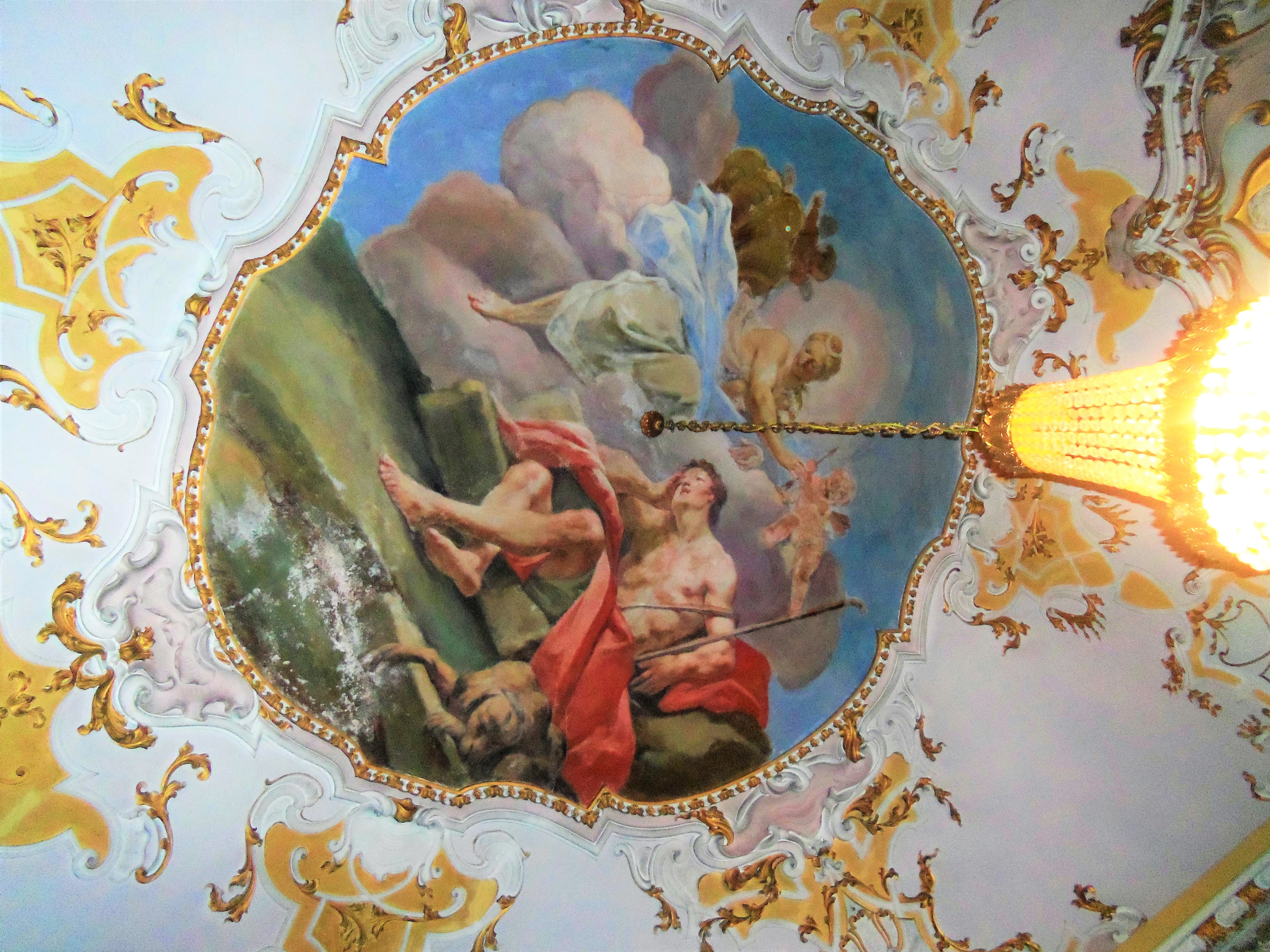
Giovanni Angelo Borroni, Diana and Endymone

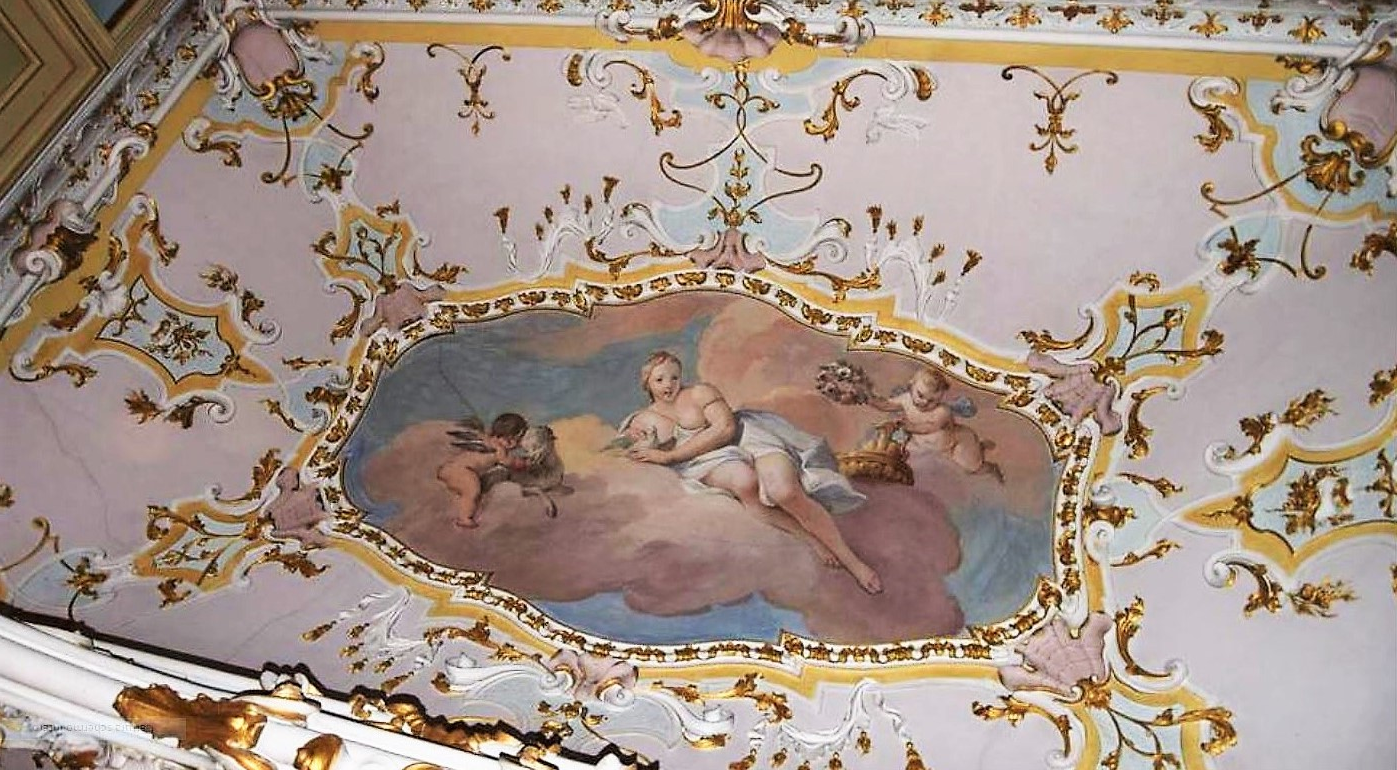
Giovanni Angelo Borroni, Venus

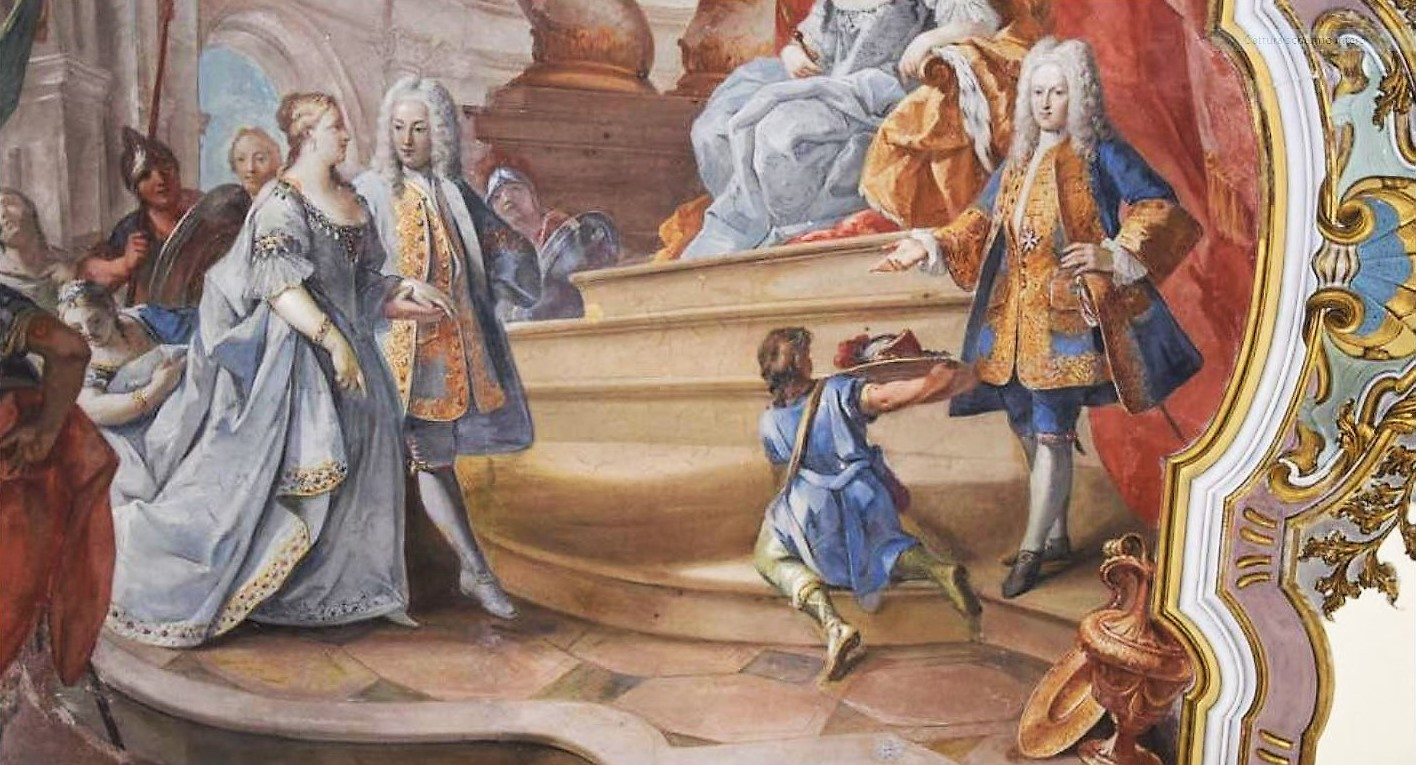
Giovanni Angelo Borroni, Antoniotto Botta Adorno at the feet of the Tsarina together with Anthony Ulrich of Brunswick and his wife Anna Leopoldovna.

== Architecture ==
The remarkably large complex is made up of four bodies arranged around a rectangular courtyard, with the main facade facing Piazza Botta, and another wing to the right. The building appears today in its "classicist" guise, the result of the interventions and remodeling between 1887 and 1893, designed by the engineer Leopoldo Mansueti and implemented by the engineer Augusto Maciachini, which already at the time aroused controversy because they destroyed many baroque rooms of the building. In fact, the current facade on the square, the two symmetrical staircases, the architectural definition of the elevations on the courtyard and the one on the garden area date back to this period, now largely occupied by pavilions and buildings built for scientific institutes and from the Labor Clinic. Furthermore, still in the same years, a new building was built at the back of the noble court, equipped with large semicircular exedras equipped with tall ventilation chimneys made in imitation of minarets.

The facade has a classicist physiognomy: centrally it is marked by a double order of semi-columns (Doric on the ground floor and Ionic on the first floor) which frame seven axes of windows, and with an arched portal in the centre. The first floor, rusticated, has windows, while on the first floor there are framed windows, crowned by alternating triangular and semicircular tympanums, on a face of regular courses of bricks left exposed. The other two sides of the long facade take up, with small variations, the shapes of the central part, but are entirely plastered. Through the door you can access two symmetrical staircases, which allow you to go up to the first floor, where some rooms of the original Baroque palace have been preserved. In particular, five rooms maintain the frescoes attributed to Giuseppe Natali on the vaults, such as the room located in the north-east corner of the building, where the Translation of Psyche on Olympus is found, framed by pilasters and Doric columns and busts of divinities painted classics. Then there is the room with the large medallion on the vault depicting an Allegory of Virtue, the one with an Allegory of Fame. In correspondence with the room with the Allegory of fame, on the south side of the same building, there is a room with the abduction of Cephalus. In other rooms, covered by false ceilings or hidden by whitewashing, there are other frescoes.

Two other rooms, probably decorated after the 1738 expansion, retain the original eighteenth-century decoration: a room that served as an antechamber to a bedroom and the alcove. The first room is certainly the one that has maintained its original characteristics, it is decorated with stuccos, it retains the eighteenth-century doors in carved wood, the fireplace in polychrome marble (still equipped with the fireguard bearing the Botta Adorno coat of arms), while on the vault there is a large fresco depicting Diana and Endymion, attributed to Giovanni Angelo Borroni. The fresco on the vault of the alcove niche is of a totally different type: it shows Antoniotto Botta Adorno (sent by Maria Theresa to St. Petersburg to negotiate peace between the Austrian and Russian empires and to conclude the marriage between his cousin of the empress, Antony Ulrich of Brunswick, and the niece of the tsarina, Anna Leopoldovna) at the feet of the tsarina Anna of Russia enthroned together with the two spouses.
