= Battle of Schärding =

1742 War of the Austrian Succession event

- Part of the War of Austrian Succession
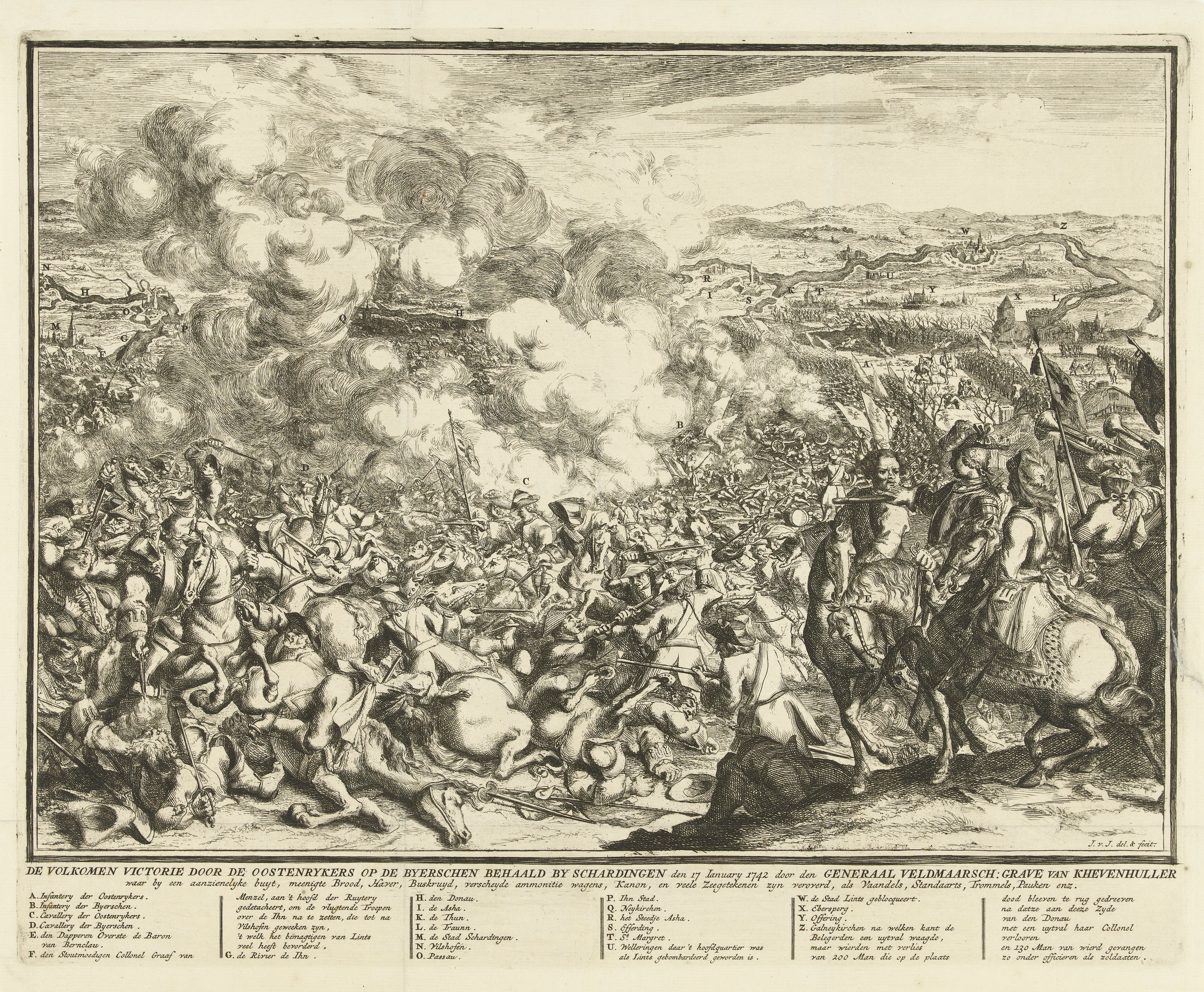
- 18th-century engraving of the battle
Date	17 January 1742
Location	Schärding, (present-day Austria) 48°27′25″N 13°25′54″E
Result	Austrian victory

Belligerents
Habsburg Monarchy	Bavaria

Commanders and leaders
(Habsburg monarchy) Ludwig Khevenhüller (Habsburg monarchy) Johann Bärnklau	(Electorate of Bavaria) Maximilian Gaëtan, Count of Toerring Seefeld

Strength
4,000	7,000

Casualties and losses
100	650, 5 guns, 10 colors

The Battle of Schärding (17 January 1742) took place during the War of the Austrian Succession near the present German-Austrian border. Johann Leopold Bärnklau with 4,000 Austrians defeated Count Toerring and 7,000 Bavarians. The Austrians lost 100 casualties while inflicting 650 casualties on their adversaries and capturing 5 cannons and 10 colors. This was part of an Austrian invasion of Bavarian territory under the overall command of Ludwig Andreas von Khevenhüller. Subsequently, most of the Electorate of Bavaria was overrun.

== Forces ==
Johann Leopold Bärnklau commanded a force numbering 3,953 men. The infantry regiments were Livingstein (1,225 men), Wurmbrand (569), and Gyulai (949). The Pandur (Croat) battalions included the Warasdiner (785) and Carlstädter (332). There were also 80 sharpshooters and 13 artillerymen.
