= Jean Thierry du Mont, comte de Gages =

Spanish Army officer (1682–1753)

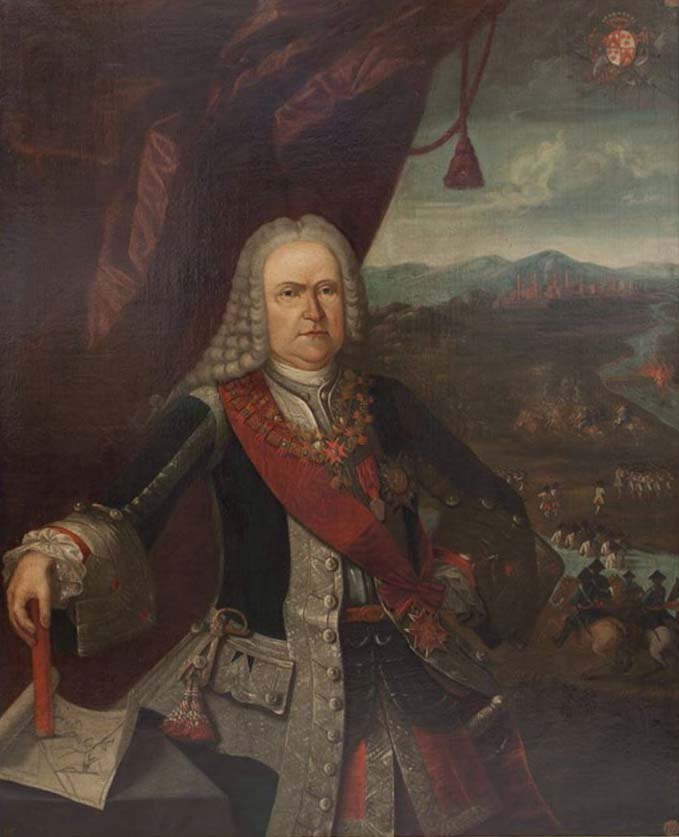
Portrait of Gages

Jean Bonaventure Thierry du Mont, 1st Count of Gages (27 December 1682 – 31 January 1753) was a Spanish Army officer who served in the War of Spanish Succession, War of the Polish Succession and War of the Austrian Succession.

== Life ==
Jean Bonaventure Thierry du Mont was born in Mons in the Spanish Netherlands on 27 December 1682. A lieutenant in the Walloon Guards, du Mont fought for the Spanish in many battles during the War of Spanish Succession, distinguishing himself in the Battle of Villaviciosa, and he also took part in the Spanish expedition to Oran (1732). During the War of Polish Succession (1733–1738), Spain retrieved Naples and Sicily, with du Mont participating under the José Carrillo, Duke of Montemar in the Battle of Bitonto.

=== War of the Austrian Succession ===
Du Mont is best known for his role in the War of the Austrian Succession. King Philip V, but mostly his second wife, energetic and ambitious former Italian princess Elizabeth of Parma, wanted to retake all former Spanish territories in Italy, including the Milan and Parma.

The war in Italy was fought between a French-Spanish coalition, commanded by Infante Felipe, son of king Philip V of Spain, assisted between others by the French Marshal Maillebois, and du Mont as Captain General of the Spanish and Neapolitan armies on the one hand, and an Austro-Sardinian coalition, backed by Great Britain on the other hand.

On 8 February 1743 du Mont defeated the Austrians and Sardinians at the Battle of Campo Santo. When a French army under Maurice de Saxe defeated the Pragmatic Army at Battle of Fontenoy in 1745, the Spanish Crown granted du Mont the county of Gages, near his birthplace until then occupied by the Austrians since 1713. Meanwhile, Gages fought against the Austrians in the Milanese and Piedmont, Parma and Piacenza supported by the Genoese, following with a victory in the Battle of Bassignano in September 1745.

Towards the end of 1745 Alexandria and Milan were also conquered, but then the chances of war turned. The Austrians took back Milan on 18 March 1746 and the Spanish-Neapolitan army under the count of Gages was beaten by the Austrians at the Battle of Piacenza (16 June 1746), and the Battle of Tidone (10 August 1746). The new King of Spain, Ferdinand VI of Spain, the half brother of King Charles of Naples and Sicily (later also King of Spain under the name Charles III of Spain), was probably well advised to stop this adventurous and costly war. Spain came from the war with the Duchy of Parma and Piacenza, although not Milan.

=== Later life ===
Juan Buenaventura Thierry du Mont was after the war awarded the title of Viceroy of Navarre in 1749. Some 4 years later he died there, in Pamplona, 1753. He was much interested in paving adequately many roads used during many centuries taking particular care on any Roman remains in or around such roads. His tomb was moved several times, specially during the Napoleonic Wars to avoid desecration by the French Imperial soldiers. After two or more moves, his mausoleum was placed in the cloister of the Pamplona Cathedral, where it can be seen today.

== Some references ==
- http://www.diariodenavarra.es/decimoaniversario/noticias/20051030/semana/tumbas-historia.html?id=20051030&dia=20051030&ht=20051030/semana/tumbas-historia
- https://web.archive.org/web/20171010015723/http://www.asasve.es/portal/index.php?mod=article&cat=articulos&article=63.
- http://www.uned.es/ca-tudela/revista2/REVISTA5/n003/ana_mendiorozindex.htm. This is an IT access to the article:

EL CONDE DE GAGES, VIRREY DE NAVARRA DURANTE 1749-1753 by Ana Mendioroz Lacambra, published in Cuadernos del Marqués de San Adrián", reported as under the address: http://www.uned.es/ca-tudela/.../ana_mendiorozindex.htm

- http://www.oronoz.com/paginas/muestrafotostitulos.php?pedido=NAVARRA%20PAMPLONA%20CATEDRAL-INTERIOR&tabla=Claves

Some 80 color photographs, probably copyrighted for no educational purposes, as they can be purchased, of Gothic style Pamplona Cathedral. The gotic tombstones of many Navarrese kings and their wives are fabulous.

- Los Ingenieros militares en España, siglo XVIII: repertorio biográfico e inventario de su labor científica y espacial by Horacio Capel Sáez et al., Edic. Univ. Barcelona, 483 pages, (1983). ISBN 84-7528-117-6
- Los ingenieros militares de la Monarquía Hispánica en los siglos XVII y XVIII. Coord. by Alicia Cámara, Ministerio de Defensa, Madrid, (2005), some 381 pages.
