= Antoniotto Botta Adorno =

High officer (1688–1774)

Antoniotto Adorno
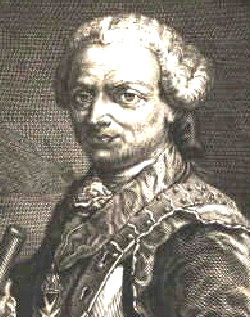
- Born: 1688; Castelletto di Branduzzo, Duchy of Milan
- Died: 29 December 1774 (aged 85–86); Torre d'Isola, Duchy of Milan
- Burial place: Pavia, Lombardy, Italy
- Military career
- Allegiance: Habsburg monarchy
- Conflicts: Austro-Turkish War (1716–1718); Siege of Belgrade; War of the Austrian Succession; Battle of Piacenza; Battle of Rottofreddo; Siege of Genoa

Antoniotto Botta Adorno or Anton Otto Marchese Botta d'Adorno (1688 – 29 December 1774) was a high officer of the Habsburg monarchy and a plenipotentiary of the Austrian Netherlands.

== Biography ==
He was born in Branduzzo, present-day Lombardy, to a noble family from Genoa whose members included seven doges of that city. His mother had an alleged love affair with King Philip V of Spain. A year after his birth his father, accused of an attempted coup, was expelled from the Republic of Genoa. In 1700, Antoniotto's father died, and, as the family fiefs went to his elder brother Alessandro, he chose a military career.

He distinguished himself during the Siege of Belgrade (1717), where he fought alongside Eugene of Savoy. Promoted subsequently as lieutenant colonel, general and marshal, he received the supreme command of Austrian troops in northern Italy during the War of Austrian Succession. In 1746, he led the Austro-Savoyard right wing in the victorious Battle of Piacenza against the French-Spanish coalition. He succeeded the sick Josef Wenzel, Prince of Liechtenstein as Austrian Supreme Commander in Italy, and fought the retreating Franco-Spanish troops in the Battle of Rottofredo.

On 7 September the same year, after occupying Genoa, he became Austrian governor of the city. He taxed Genoa so hard (Ai Genovesi non lascerò altro che gli occhi per piangere; I will leave the Genoese only their eyes to weep), that he was chased on 5 December by a popular revolt led by Balilla. Having lost the city, he was relieved of all military commands for the rest of the war.

In 1749, a year after the Treaty of Aix-la-Chapelle, he became plenipotentiary of the Austrian Netherlands under Prince Charles Alexander of Lorraine. He reformed the army and tried to improve the conditions of the country.

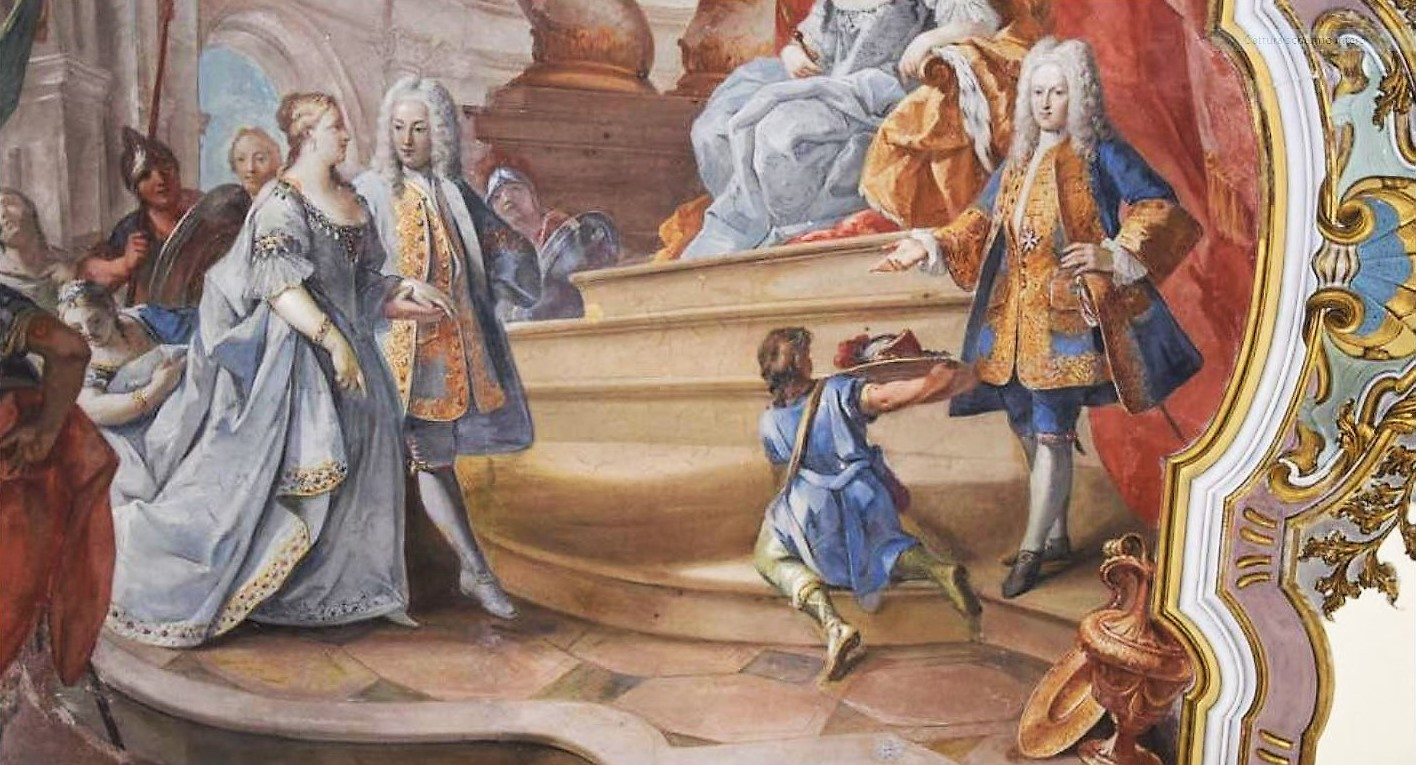
Giovanni Angelo Borroni, Antoniotto Botta Adorno at the court of Tsarina Anna Ivanovna, Pavia, Palazzo Botta Adorno

Four years later, in 1753, he stepped down from his office in the Austrian Netherlands. Count Johann Karl Philipp von Cobenzl became his successor as minister plenipotentiary in Brussels. Adorno returned to Italy and became prime minister of the Grand Duchy of Tuscany.

In 1762, he was appointed as ambassador at Catherine II of Russia's court. Three years later, he became regent of the Grand Duchy of Tuscany after the death of emperor Francis I.

After his assignment in Tuscany, he returned to Pavia, where, thanks to the large patrimony he had accumulated, he had his family's palace in the city (Palazzo Botta Adorno) enlarged and had a villa built in Torre d'Isola in the Pavia countryside. He died at Torre d'Isola, near Pavia, in 1774. He was buried in the Church of Santi Gervasio e Protasio in Pavia.

== Sources ==
- Donaver, Federico (1967). Storia di Genova. Renzo Tolozzi Editore.

Preceded by Count Karl Josef Batthyány	Authorized minister in the Austrian Netherlands (plenipotentiary); 1747–1753	Succeeded by Count Karl von Cobenzl
