= Battle of Campo Santo =

1743 battle of the War of the Austrian Succession

- Part of the War of the Austrian Succession
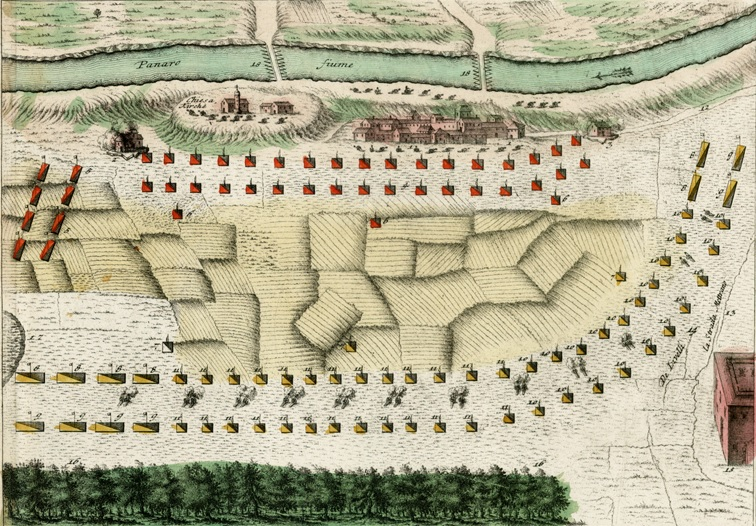
- Map of the battle
Date	8 February 1743
Location	Camposanto, Italy 44°47′41″N 11°08′44″E
Result	Inconclusive (Note: Austro–Sardinian victory Spanish victory)

Belligerents
(Habsburg monarchy) Habsburg Austria; Kingdom of Sardinia	Kingdom of Spain

Commanders and leaders
(Habsburg monarchy) Graf von Traun; (Kingdom of Sardinia) Count Aspremont	(Spain) Comte de Gages

Strength
11,000 total; 12,000 total; --9,000 infantry; --3,000 cavalry; --25 guns	13,000 total; 14,000 total; --11,400 infantry; --2,600 cavalry; --12 guns

Casualties and losses
397 dead; 1,153 wounded & captured, 4 guns	1,755 dead; 1,307 wounded; 824 captured
- Location within Italy

The Battle of Campo Santo (8 February 1743) was fought outside Camposanto, Italy, during the War of the Austrian Succession. A Spanish army under Jean Thierry du Mont, comte de Gages faced a combined Austrian–Sardinian force led by Otto Ferdinand, Graf von Abensperg und Traun. Gages invaded the Duchy of Modena and Reggio by crossing the Panaro River but was brought to battle by Traun's army. The Spanish cavalry won an initial success but failed to capitalize on it. Traun earned acclaim by his brisk handling of the battle and by forcing Gages to recross the Panaro at the end of the day. Both sides claimed victory, but the Spanish suffered significantly greater losses and abandoned Bologna to their opponents several weeks later.

== Background ==
In November 1741, a Spanish expeditionary force evaded the Royal Navy's outnumbered Mediterranean Fleet under Vice-Admiral of the Blue Nicholas Haddock and landed 14,000 troops at Orbetello on the west coast of Italy. This feat was repeated in January 1742 when the Spanish Navy landed 12,800 more soldiers at La Spezia. This project sprang from the desire of Queen Elisabeth Farnese of Spain's desire to carve out a new principality in Italy for her son Philip. The territory in question belonged to the Habsburg monarchy but Austria already had its hands full defending Bohemia against the Kingdom of France and the Kingdom of Prussia. It appeared that Habsburg lands were ripe for the taking.

The Kingdom of Sardinia had been wavering but the Spanish threat drove it to form an alliance with Austria. On 1 February 1742, Sardinia's foreign minister Carlo Vincenzo Ferrero d'Ormea signed the Convention of Turin with Austria's representative Ludwig von Schulenburg-Oeynhausen. Accordingly, 18,000 Sardinian troops led by King Charles Emmanuel III took the field together with 12,000 Austrians under Otto von Traun. The veteran Traun had been appointed Field Marshal in 1741. At the same time, the Mediterranean Fleet was substantially enlarged, making further Spanish reinforcement by sea unlikely.

At first, the Spanish intended for the Orbetello force to march north to join the troops at La Spezia before invading the Duchy of Parma and Piacenza. The plan was discarded when its authors realized that the army would have to fight its way through the mountains northeast of La Spezia. Instead, 13,500 troops under José Carrillo de Albornoz, 1st Duke of Montemar marched east to Spoleto, where they rendezvoused with 12,000 Neapolitan allies under Francesco Eboli, Duke of Castropignano. The La Spezia force marched through the Grand Duchy of Tuscany and joined the other forces at Rimini on the east coast. By this time, the Spanish-Neapolitan army counted only 30,000 men, having lost hundreds of soldiers from sickness or desertion.

== Operations ==
Blocked by the reinforced Mediterranean Fleet, Spain asked France for permission to march troops across southern France to Italy. France, which previously denied this request, answered in the affirmative and a force under Don Philip advanced as far as Antibes. The Spanish advance stalled because they were unable to use the coastal road, as the Royal Navy remained close offshore and Sardinian troops blocked the mountain passes. By May 1742, the Duke of Montemar's army had shrunk from desertion and disease to 25,000 men. The Duke of Modena joined the Spanish cause with 5,000 men but this had negative consequences. The Austro–Sardinian army laid siege to Modena's citadel on 10 May and secured its surrender on 29 May. Montemar marched his Spanish–Neapolitan army up to the Panaro River on Modena's border in June 1742 but was blocked from going any farther by the larger Austro–Sardinian army. Though the authorities in Madrid demanded an assault, Montemar prudently declined to attack and withdrew. Austria and Sardinia had defended their territories but Spain's army remained a threat.

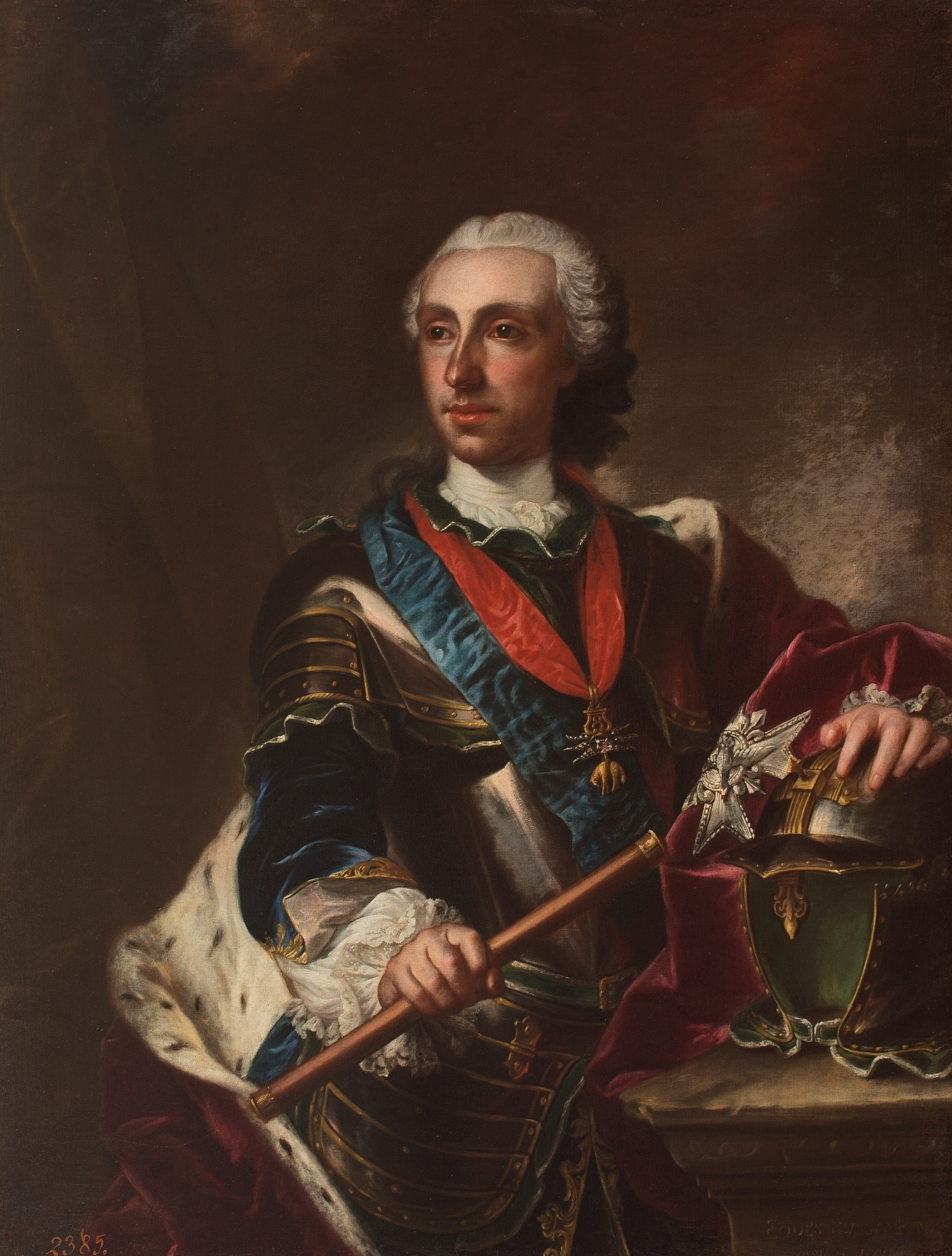
Spain's goal was to gain an Italian realm for Don Philip.

Madrid ordered the army under Don Philip and Ignace-François de Glymes-Brabant, Lord of la Falize at Antibes to move northwards to occupy the Duchy of Savoy. By September 1742, Savoy was occupied by Spanish forces. The Habsburg ruler Maria Theresa hoped to use the combined army of Traun and King Charles Emmanuel III to crush Montemar and invade the Kingdom of Naples. Because Savoy was being overrun, Charles Emmanuel instead returned to Piedmont with part of his forces and moved the rest to defend Parma. This ended any chance of an Austro–Sardinian offensive in Italy.

Vice-Admiral of the Red Thomas Mathews, the new commander-in-chief of the Mediterranean Fleet, sent his subordinate Commodore William Martin to the port of Naples with a squadron. On 19 August 1742, Martin's squadron arrived off the port and he threatened to bombard the city unless Charles III of Spain withdrew his troops from Montemar's army. Bowing to the threat, Charles pulled the remaining 10,000 Neapolitan troops from the army of his ally. Martin's squadron then sailed to Genoa where he coerced the Republic of Genoa into ceasing its cooperation with the Spanish.

Frustrated at the lack of progress, King Philip V of Spain and his wife Elisabeth Farnese replaced Montemar with Jean Thierry du Mont, comte de Gages. Even without the Neapolitan troops, Gages outnumbered his foes, so he advanced with over 13,000 Spanish soldiers to capture Bologna in October 1742. When the Spanish army reached the Panaro, it found itself stopped by Traun's defending army. At the end of September, King Charles Emmanuel launched a campaign to recover Savoy, which enjoyed initial success. Unhappy with this setback, Philip V replaced Glymes with Jaime de Guzmán-Dávalos y Spínola, Marquis de La Mina. By January 1743, La Mina cleared Savoy of the last Sardinian soldiers. Savoy represented Spain's bargaining chip in any negotiations but in the meantime, Spanish soldiers terrorized the duchy's inhabitants.

== Battle ==
=== Prelude ===
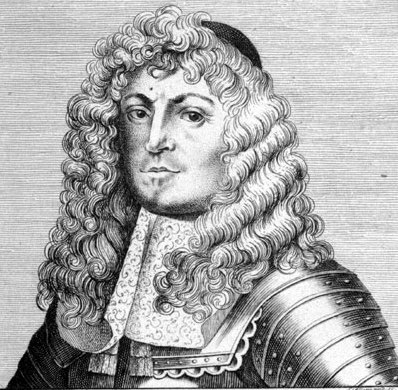
Otto von Traun

In the mid-18th century, a battle only occurred when both commanders wanted one or if one side managed to surprise the other. This situation arose because deploying an army took so much time. A commander who wanted to avoid combat could easily withdraw his army before the other side could get their troops arranged to attack. Another reason for 18th century generals to steer clear of battles was their expense in terms of casualties. A famous contemporary of Traun and Gages, Maurice de Saxe once stated, "I do not favor pitched battles ... I am convinced that a skilful general could make war all his life without being forced into one". Gages needed to cross the Panaro to advance but so far, every attempt to do so had been cleverly blocked by Traun's army.

The stalemate was resolved when Gages received new instructions from Elizabeth Farnese. He was to launch an attack within three days or resign his command. In the Allied camp, the Sardinian General Ferdinand Charles, comte d'Aspremont-Lynden desired to fight and win a glorious victory but he had been resisted by the defensive-minded Traun. Fortunately for Gages, Traun was ready to oblige him. Traun was aware of the criticism levelled at him in Vienna, where Maria Theresa's foreign minister Johann Christoph von Bartenstein and others were losing patience. The Austrian government feared that Charles Emmanuel might reach an accommodation with the Spanish. To prevent that, it would be helpful for the Austrians and Sardinians to fight a battle as allies. Traun's normal reticence to fight was set aside.

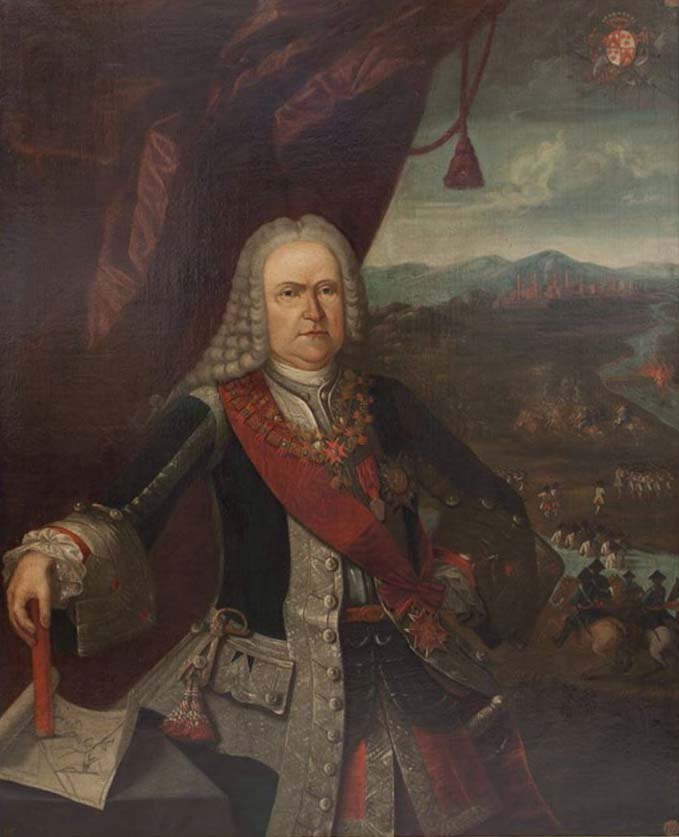
Jean Thierry du Mont, comte de Gages

Gages arranged a grand ball for the people of Bologna but it was only a stratagem to trick his enemies. Instead, the Spanish officers quietly left the ball one by one and joined their soldiers who were already assembled. The Spanish army marched north and on 3 February 1743 finally outmaneuvered its enemies, gaining a crossing of the Panaro at Camposanto and entering the Duchy of Modena. The initial crossing was made by 12 grenadier companies of the Spanish Guards. Two bridges were built to span the Panaro, one of boats and one of wagons. Patrols were sent downstream and twenty Austrian boats filled with provisions and new uniforms were captured.

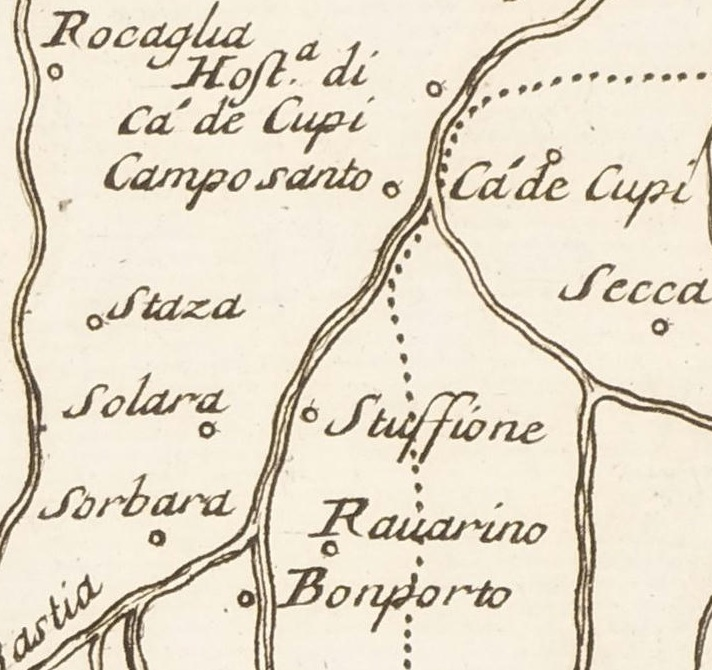
Campo Santo and environs, 1690 map

On 4 February, the Spanish army advanced southwest to Solara while leaving 600 men under the Marquis of Barcena to guard the bridges at Camposanto. From there, 3,000 cavalry and grenadiers under Lieutenant General the Count of Beaufort probed south toward the Austro-Sardinian fortifications at Bomporto. After skirmishing with their opponents, Beaufort's detachment pulled back to Solara. The following day, Gages withdrew the Spanish army to Camposanto, hoping to fool his opponents into thinking that his objective was Mantua and drawing them out of their position at Bomporto. On 6 February, elements of the Austro–Sardinian army began appearing near Camposanto. The allied forces suddenly vanished from view at 2:00 pm on 7 February.

Reed Browning and David G. Chandler asserted that the Spanish army numbered 13,000 soldiers and the Austrian–Sardinian army counted 11,000 men. Statistician Gaston Bodart stated that the Spanish army numbered 13,000 men, including 11,000 infantry and 2,000 cavalry, while the Austro-Sardinians counted 11,000 men, of which 8,400 were infantry and 2,600 were cavalry. Edward Cust credited the Spanish army with 24,000 men and their opponents with 20,000. Historians Virgilio Ilari, Giancarlo Boeri and Ciro Paoletti provided the most detailed numbers. They stated the 14,000-strong Spanish army comprised 11,400 infantry, 2,600 cavalry and 12 guns, while the 12,000-man Austrian–Sardinian army had 9,000 infantry, 3,000 cavalry and 25 guns.

=== Action ===
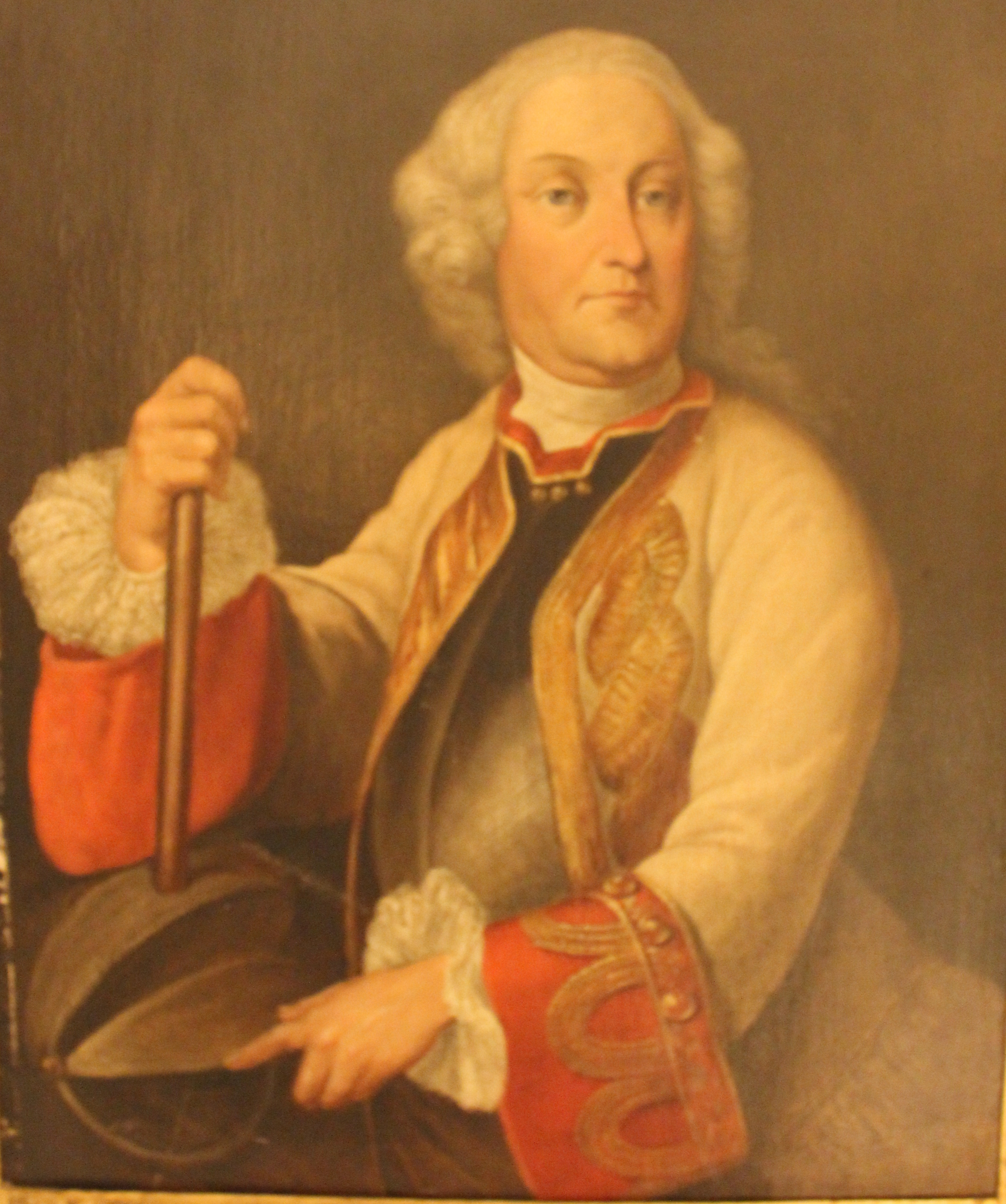
Count Aspremont

On the morning of 8 February 1743, Gages drew up his army facing northwest on the outskirts of Camposanto arranged in the traditional fashion with infantry in the center and cavalry on the wings. The Spanish commander deployed his army in two lines with both right and left flanks resting on the Panaro. The town of Camposanto was behind the Spanish center and the Spanish artillery was divided into three batteries. The Spanish cavalry and dragoons were arranged with nine squadrons on the right and three squadrons on the left. At 10:00 am, Traun's army appeared again, led by their cavalry and the front of their infantry columns.

Traun drew up his army with infantry in the center and cavalry on the wings, parallel to the Spanish lines. He placed the Sardinian cavalry on his left flank under d'Aspremont-Lynden. Being slightly outnumbered, Traun chose to gamble with an unorthodox strategy. Instead of aligning his soldiers directly opposite the Spanish line, he shifted his troops to the northeast. This placed Traun's infantry center opposite the gap between Gages' infantry center and his right wing of cavalry. This meant that Traun would have numerical superiority on his left wing, so he could deliver a flank attack on the Spanish right. The disadvantage was that Traun's own right flank would be vulnerable to an attack by the Spanish left flank. Traun hoped the troops of his right wing could delay the Spanish left wing long enough for the action on his other wing to be decisive.

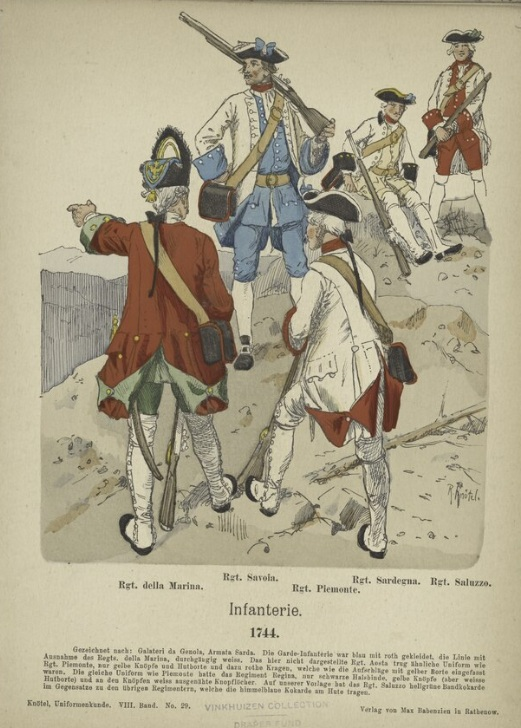
Sardinian infantry 1744

Traun hoped to keep the battle short so Gages would not have time to react to his unconventional plan. Gages might have waited until the following day to start the battle. Instead, Gages unwittingly chose 4:00 pm to launch his attack, which left only two hours of February daylight for a battle. This fitted neatly with Traun's plan. The Spanish cavalry on the right charged, wounded Aspremont and scattered the Sardinian horsemen on the Allied left. Instead of wheeling and striking the exposed Traun's left-flank infantry, the Spanish mounted troops indulged in a reckless pursuit of the fleeing Sardinian cavalry. The Spanish left-flank cavalry also enjoyed an initial success against the Austrian cavalry on the Allied right flank.

Traun rose to the occasion, sending support to his broken left flank and leading his infantry against the Spanish. Taking over from the disabled Aspremont, Karl Sigmund Friedrich Wilhelm Leutrum von Ertingen stabilized the situation on the Austro-Sardinian left. On the allied right wing, Ludwig von Schulenburg-Oeynhausen organized a successful counterattack by the Austrian horsemen. Despite having two horses shot under him, Traun managed to stay on top of the situation. Gages stayed in the center of his army, failing to grasp the state of affairs. At length, the entire Austro-Sardinian line drove forward, forcing back the Spanish forces. Gages ordered a retreat at nightfall, aware that the river at his back could lead to a disaster. The Spanish army withdrew to Bologna.

== Results ==
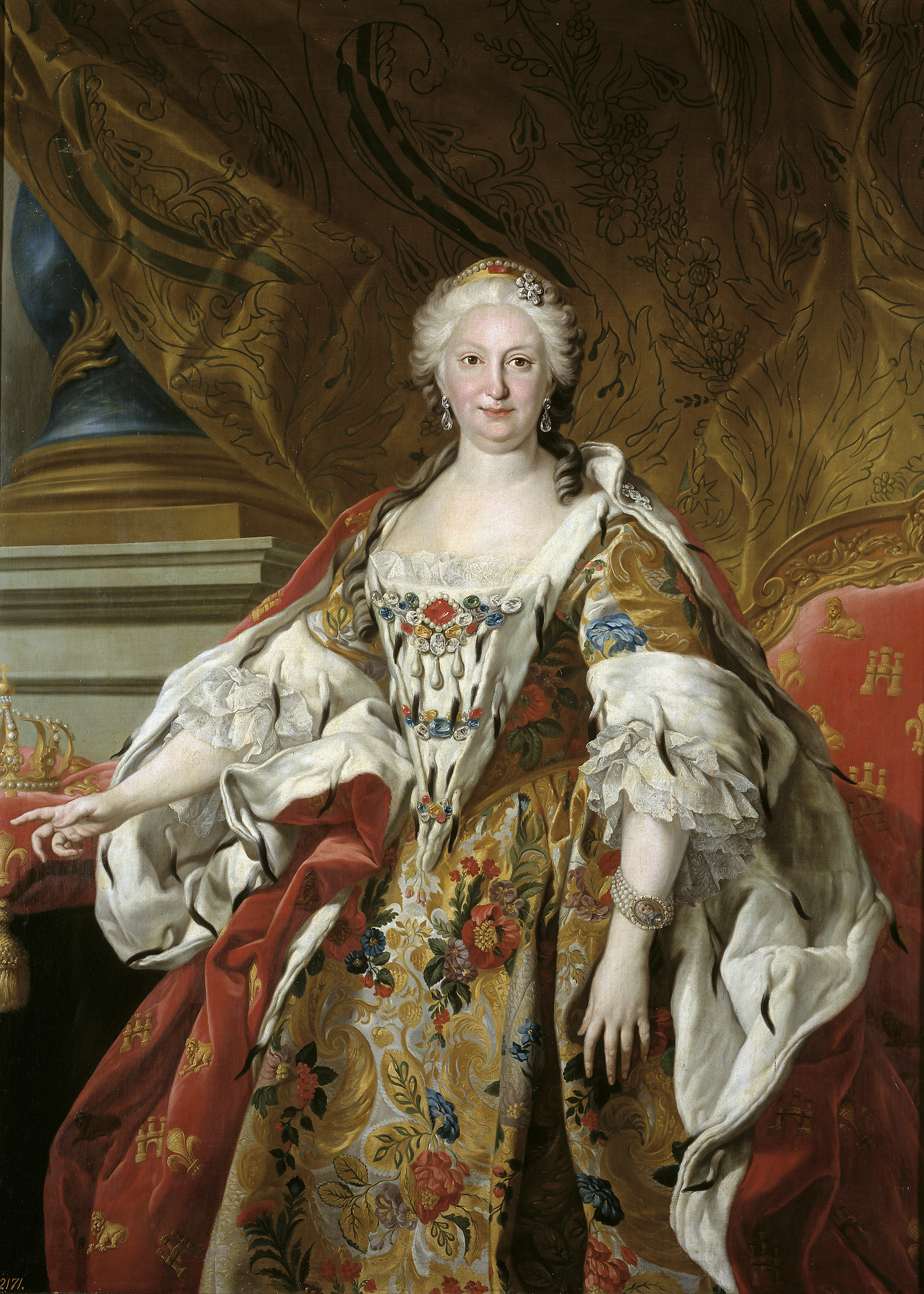
Elisabeth Farnese

Browning listed casualties in the Battle of Campo Santo as 4,000 Spanish and 2,000 Austro–Sardinian, while describing the action as a victory for Traun. Chandler and Bodart gave Spanish losses as 3,200 killed and wounded plus 800 captured and Austro-Sardinian losses as 1,600 killed and wounded plus 400 men and 4 guns captured. They called the battle a Spanish success. Cust gave casualties as 3,000 Spanish and 2,000 Austro-Sardinian, with the Spanish forced to retreat. Ilari, Boeri and Paoletti listed Spanish losses as 1,755 dead, 1,307 wounded and 824 prisoners, while the Austro-Sardinians lost 397 dead and 1,153 wounded or prisoners. Aspremont was reported to be fatally wounded by Browning, Bodart, and Cust. In fact, Aspremont survived his injury and won promotion to Field Marshal in 1754 before dying in 1772. General officers who died in the battle were the Spaniards Maestre de campo Conde de Jauche and Maestre de campo Marquis de Mayorea, and the Austrian Feldmarschall Leutnant Ferdinand von Payersberg.

Traun gave credit to the courage of his Austrian and Sardinian soldiers, though observers also praised Traun's crisp troop handling. Gages claimed a victory, pointing out the prowess of the Spanish cavalry and the fact that Traun's army also pulled back after the battle. Elisabeth Farnese was not taken in by Gages' assertion because the battle report was written in Bologna, indicating a Spanish withdrawal. Nevertheless, the battle was given a Te Deum celebration in Madrid. Plagued by more illnesses and desertions, Gages' army shrank so much that it was unable to hold Bologna. Reduced to 6,000 effectives, the Spanish army abandoned Bologna to the Austro-Sardinians on 26 March 1743 and retreated to Rimini. For the moment, Traun had saved Northern Italy for Maria Theresa. The failed Spanish campaign brought a promise by its Bourbon ally, France, to expand its assistance.
