= Battle of Bassignano =

1745 battle

Battle of Bassignana
- Part of the War of the Austrian Succession
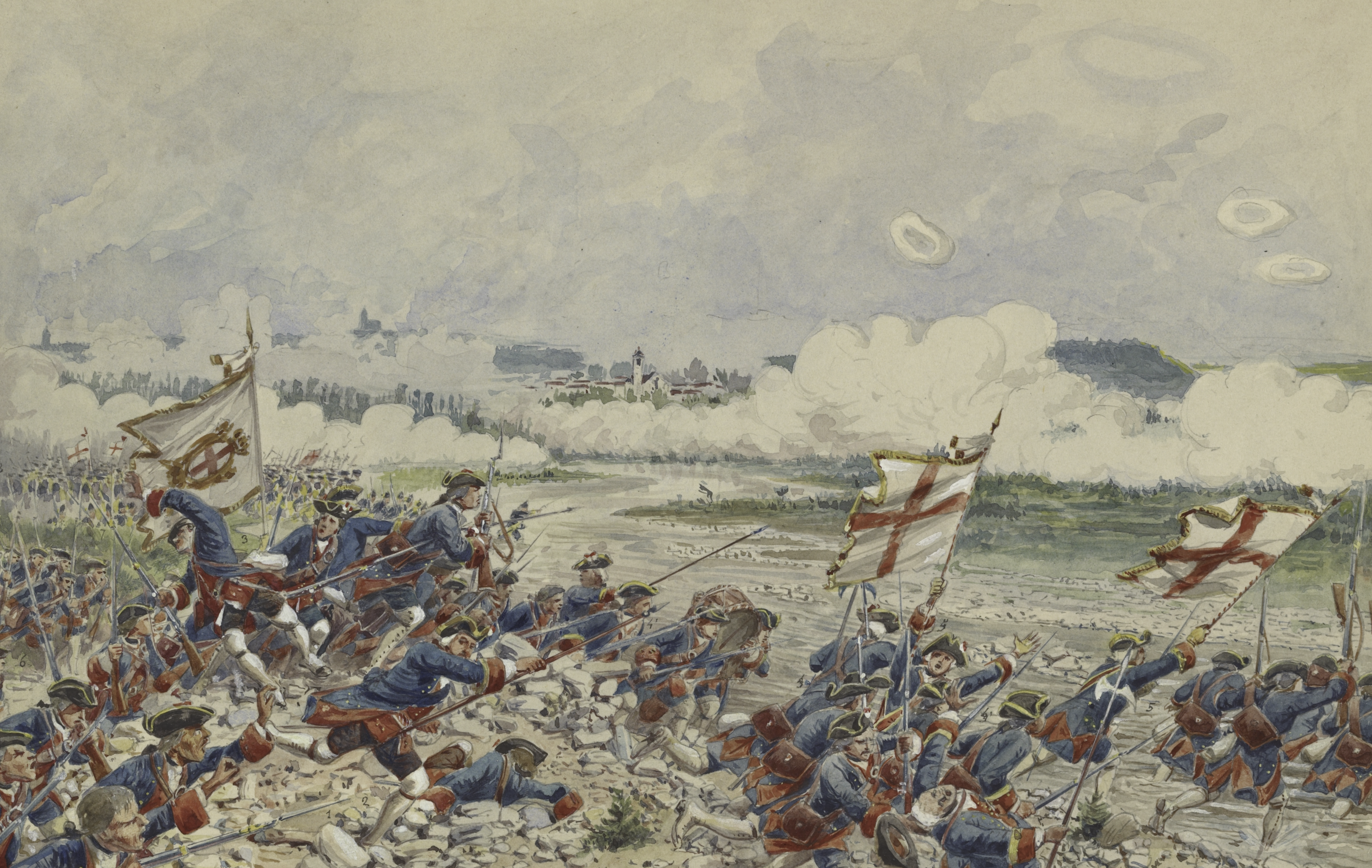
- Genoese infantry charging during the battle of Bassignana
Date	27 September 1745
Location	Bassignana near Alessandria, AL, Italy
Result	Bourbon-Genoese victory

Belligerents
Kingdom of France; Kingdom of Spain; Republic of Genoa	Kingdom of Sardinia; Austria

Commanders and leaders
(Kingdom of France) Marquis of Maillebois (Spain) Infante Philip (Spain) Comte de Gages (Republic of Genoa) Giovanni Francesco II Brignole Sale	(Kingdom of Sardinia) Charles Emmanuel III of Savoy

Strength
70,000	55,000

Casualties and losses
500: 200 dead, 300 wounded	1,500: 300 dead, 1,200 wounded or captured

The Battle of Bassignana (Bassignano) was fought in the Italian campaign of the War of the Austrian Succession on 27 September 1745. It resulted in a victory for the combined armies of the Bourbon kingdoms of France and Spain and the Genoese Republic over Austria and the Kingdom of Sardinia.

The Bourbon armies, finally united after a two-year campaign, won through a maneuver that caused 25,000 Austrian troops to head towards Piacenza and leave their Sardinian allies isolated. The Sardinians were then overwhelmed and beaten.

== Battle ==
The Spanish forces along with a strong contingent of Genoese captured a series of towns: Tortona, Parma, Piacenza and threatened to take Milan. The Austrians moved to protect the capital of Lombardy leaving Charles Emmanuel III, the king of Sardinia, unaided with his force of 55,000. He was defeated by Gages at Bassignano who subsequently advanced the conquest of Lombardy against the advice of the French commanders who preferred the reduction of Piedmont. Gages took Casale and Milan on 16 December where the citadel held out against him. The cities of Lodi and Como soon surrendered and by the end of 1745 all of Lombardy, except for the fortress at Mantua and the citadel in Milan, were under the control of Spain and France.

== Aftermath ==
The Austrians were now unable to oppose the Spanish advance and support Piedmont to keep Charles Emmanuel in the war and the campaign had disastrous results for Maria Theresa. In order to reinforce Austrian armies in Italy peace with Prussia was a necessity and the Second Silesian War would have to be ended. As a result of the gains of the Spanish and French, Charles Emmanuel reopened negotiations with D'Argenson for an understanding between France and Sardinia and possible treaty.

With the end of the Second Silesian War, Austrian was able to send 30,000 soldiers into Italy under Count Maximilian Ulysses Browne and negotiations between France and Sardinia fell apart. The Battle of Piacenza in the following year turned back the French and the Spanish and erased the effects of Bassignano.

== Notes ==
page 233; War of the Austrian Succession by Reed Browning; The Franco-Spanish army numbered 50,000. The Piedmontese Army numbered 30,000.
