= Jaime de Guzmán-Dávalos y Spínola =

Spanish general and noble

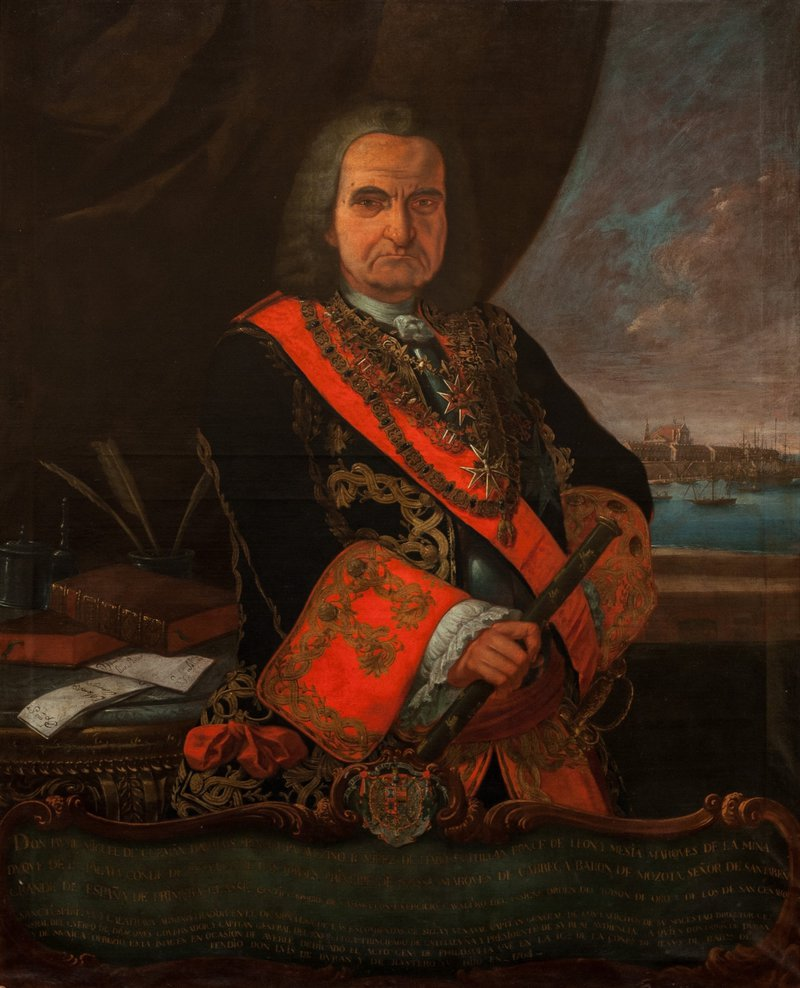
Portrait of the Marquess of la Mina (1760–1766) by Manuel Tramulles

Jaime de Guzmán y Spinola, 2nd Marquess of la Mina (1690–1767) was a Spanish Army commander and Captain General of Catalonia. He was also the fifth Count of Pezuela de las Torres, near Alcalá de Henares.

== Biography ==
He was born in Seville and baptized at the Church of San Pedro.

As a young soldier, Jaime de Guzmán y Spinola fought for Philip of Bourbon in the War of Spanish Succession and participated in the attacks on Sardinia and Sicily during the War of the Quadruple Alliance.

After the war he was appointed ambassador to France (1736–1740). During this period, Mina corresponded frequently with the French Secretary of State for Foreign Affairs, Amelot, to negotiate a mutual defence treaty between Spain and France, following the War of the Polish Succession.

In 1738 he was made a Knight in the Order of the Golden Fleece, Spain's highest decoration.

At the outbreak of the War of the Austrian Succession he joined the Spanish army in Italy and played an important role in the Battle of Madonna dell'Olmo. After the disastrous 1746 campaign, he replaced the Count de Gages as supreme commander of the Spanish troops in Italy. He successfully relieved the besieged Genoa before the end of the war.

In 1742 he was appointed interim Captain General of Catalonia, a function he exercised from Italy until 1747 (with a gap between 1744-1746), finally taking up his post in 1754.

During his term of power he set up the school of military engineers in Barcelona, the Academia de Matemáticas de Barcelona.

He did much to approve the access to the city from land and sea, the water supply and the street lighting. His most important works were the construction of Barceloneta, the San Fernando Castle in Figueras and the reconstruction of the Montjuich fortress. He was buried in the Church of San Miguel del Puerto, in the Barceloneta.

He was replaced by Irish-Spanish General Bernardo O'Connor.

== Sources ==
- Biography of the Marquis de la Mina
- Álvarez Nogal, Carlos (2005). "La formación de un mercado europeo de plata: mecanismos y costes de transporte en España". Universidad Carlos III de Madrid.
