= Jean-Baptiste François des Marets, marquis de Maillebois =

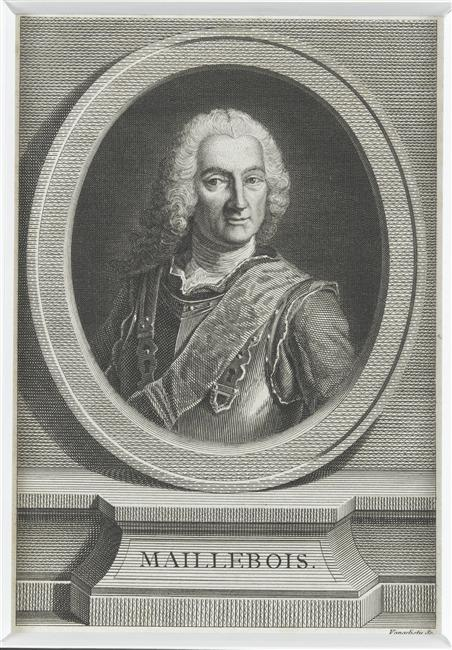
Jean-Baptiste Francois des Marets, marquis de Maillebois

Jean-Baptiste François Desmarets (Paris, 1682 – 1762), marquis of Maillebois, was a Marshal of France.

== Biography ==
He was the son of Nicolas Desmarets, marquis of Maillebois (marquis de Maillebois, in French) (1648–1721) Controller-General of Finances during the reign of Louis XIV of France and nephew of Jean-Baptiste Colbert.

He learned the art of war from Claude Louis Hector de Villars. He distinguished himself during the Siege of Lille (1708), and commanded a division in Italy during the War of Polish Succession. He conquered Corsica in less than three weeks (1739), and received the rank of Marshal in 1741.

During the War of the Austrian Succession he was sent again to fight the Austrians in Italy and won the Battle of Bassignano in 1745. The next year though, he was decisively beaten by superior forces in the Battle of Piacenza, after which he had to abandon the Duchy of Milan.

After the war, he was made governor of the Alsace (1748).

=== Marriage and children ===
He married in January 1713 Louise Marie Emmanuelle de Tourzel d'Alègre (born 1692), daughter of Yves d'Alègre, Marquis de Tourzel, Marshal of France, and Jeanne Françoise Garaud.
They had one son and three daughters.
