= Dauphin =

Dauphin (French: "dolphin", plural dauphins), in the French and English languages, generally means an heir apparent. It may also refer to:

== Noble and royal title ==
- Dauphin of Auvergne
- Dauphin of France, heir apparent to the French crown
- Dauphin of Viennois

== People ==
- Dauphin (surname)

== Places ==
=== Manitoba, Canada ===
- Dauphin (provincial electoral district)
- Dauphin, Manitoba
- Dauphin Lake
- Dauphin River
- Rural Municipality of Dauphin

=== United States ===
- Dauphin, Pennsylvania, United States
- Dauphin, Texas, United States
- Dauphin County, Pennsylvania, United States
- Dauphin Island, Alabama, United States

=== Elsewhere ===
- Dauphin, Alpes-de-Haute-Provence, France
- Dauphin Quarter, Saint Lucia
- Dauphin River (Saint Lucia)

== Vehicles ==
- Dauphin (rocket), a French sounding rocket
- Eurocopter AS365 Dauphin, a European-made helicopter series
- Le Dauphin, defunct French car manufacturer

== Ships and boats ==
- USS Dauphin (APA-97), a Windsor-class attack transport in the U.S. Navy during World War II
- Dauphin, a French submarine seized by Italy during World War II to be converted into a cargo submarine
- Dauphin, a Nantucket whaleship that in 1821 rescued the captain and another crewman from a whaleboat of the sunken Essex whaleship

== Other uses ==
- Dauphin Technology, a defunct American manufacturer of laptops and handheld personal computers
- Dauphin railway station
- Dauphin Regional Airport
- Dauphin, a cheese, see Maroilles
- "The Dauphin" (Star Trek: The Next Generation), an episode of Star Trek: The Next Generation

== See also ==
- CCGS Cape Dauphin, a Canadian Coast Guard motor lifeboat
- Central Dauphin (disambiguation)
- Fort Dauphin (disambiguation)
- Dauphine (disambiguation), the female equivalent
- Dauphiné
