= Dauphin (surname) =

Dauphin is a surname. Notable people with the surname include:

- Charles Dauphin (c. 1620–1677), French painter
- Chuck Dauphin (1974–2019), American music journalist
- Claude Dauphin (actor) (1903–1978), French actor
- Claude Dauphin (businessman) (1951–2015), French billionaire businessman
- Claude Dauphin (politician) (born 1953), Canadian politician
- Claudine Dauphin (born 1950), a French archaeologist
- François Dauphin (born 1953), Canadian handball player
- Jacques Dauphin (1923–1994), French advertising executive
- Laurent Dauphin (born 1995), Canadian ice hockey player
- Marc Dauphin (born 1960), Canadian military surgeon
- Max Dauphin (born 1977), Luxembourgish painter
- Robert Dauphin (1905–1961), French footballer
- Ronald Dauphin, Haitian activist and political prisoner
