= Dauphine =

Dauphine is the female form of the particular French feudal (comital or princely) title of Dauphin (also Anglicized as Dolphin), applied to the wife of a Dauphin (usually in the sense of heir to the French royal throne).

- Dauphine of France
- Dauphin de Viennois
- Dauphine of Auvergne

Dauphine may also refer to:

== Places ==
- Dauphiné, a province in southeastern France
- Dauphine Street, a street in the French Quarter of New Orleans, Louisiana, United States
  - Dauphine Orleans Hotel, a hotel on Dauphine Street
- Dauphine River, a river in the L'Île-d'Orléans Regional County Municipality, Capitale-Nationale, Quebec, Canada
- Paris Dauphine University, a university near Porte Dauphine in Paris

== Other uses ==
- Berliet Dauphine 11CV, a model of automobile 1934-1939
- Pommes dauphine, a recipe for fried potato
- Renault Dauphine, a model of automobile 1956-1967
- Critérium du Dauphiné, a cycle race that before 2010 was known as the Critérium du Dauphiné Libéré
- a common fig cultivar

== See also ==
- Dauphin (disambiguation)
- Dauphinois (disambiguation)
