= Carlo Vincenzo Ferrero d'Ormea =

Italian politician and diplomat

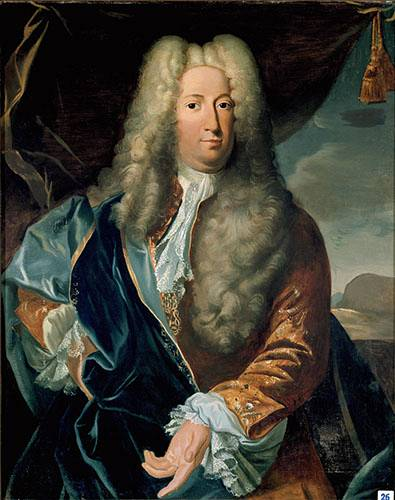

President of the Council of the Kingdom of Sardinia
- In office 1742–1745

Personal details
- Born: 5 April 1680 Mondovì, Savoyard state
- Died: 29 May 1745 (aged 65) Turin, Savoyard state
- Occupation: Politician, Diplomat

Carlo Vincenzo Ferrero d'Ormea (5 April 1680, Mondovì – 29 May 1745, Turin) was an Italian politician and diplomat. He was president of the Council of the Kingdom of Sardinia from 1742 to 1745.

== Life ==
=== Early career – from prefect to general of finances (1713–1724) ===
On 16 December 1713, he was appointed as Prefect-intendant of Susa. Here, he was faced with the complex integration and defence of the Barcelonnette area, which had been awarded to the Kingdom of Sardinia by the Treaty of Utrecht (1713). He brought this to a successful conclusion, and his ability shown in Susa was noticed in Turin.

Victor Amadeus II considered him too competent an official to be left in the province and on 16 April 1717, he appointed him General of finances. Ormea then moved to Turin, taking up lodgings in the Royal palace, in an apartment located in the so-called Palazzo Vecchio (which no longer exists today). Called to lead the state finances at a time when a great wave of reforms was unfolding, Ormea proved to be a skilled and determined collaborator, capable of interpreting the sovereign's orders and carrying them out with ruthless efficiency.

=== Embassy to Rome and concordat with Benedict XIII (1724–1730) ===
He was repeatedly sent to the court of pope Benedict XIII and gained the pope's recognition of Vittorio Amedeo II as King of Sardinia as well as concluding a concordat with the papacy in 1727, thus normalising Sardinia's relations with the papal states, which had been strained for the previous thirty years.

=== Secretary of State to the Interior (1730–1742), for foreign affairs (1732–1745) and Grand Chancellor ===
On 8 August 1730, Victor Amadeus II, who had decided to abdicate, appointed Ormea as the first Secretary of State for the Interior, replacing Pietro Mellarède, who had died on 19 March. On 3 September, the King abdicated in a ceremony at the Castello di Rivoli and moved to Chambéry.

Ormea now was the main Savoy minister, and in a short time he managed to deprive all real power from the powerful Marquis Ignazio Solaro del Borgo, Secretary of State for Foreign Affairs since 1717, gaining an almost absolute ascendancy over the new sovereign Charles Emmanuel III. This power proved decisive in September 1731, when Vittorio Amedeo tried to return to the throne. Ormea directed with cold ruthlessness the arrest of the old sovereign, followed by his detention, until his death on 31 October 1732.

In the meantime, on 18 March 1732 Charles Emmanuel III also appointed Ormea as the first Secretary of State for Foreign Affairs. With control over the two Secretariats of State and the dismissal of Ignazio Solaro del Borgo (appointed Grand Chamberlain), he was now de facto the first minister of the State and would remain so until his death, for a dozen years. The same year, the king also conferred on him the position of secretary of the Order of the Annunziata, which by tradition was assigned to the Secretary of State for Foreign Affairs, and five years later, on 19 March 1737, he was made a knight.

From this moment on, Ormea's political biography merges with that of the State.

The pro-French alliance in the War of the Polish Succession (1733–37), decreed with the Treaty of Turin (1733), and the anti-French alliance in the War of the Austrian Succession (1742–48), sanctioned with the 'Provisional convention' of 1 February 1742 and with the Treaty of Worms (1743), were sponsored and desired by him.
The 'Provisional convention', in particular, was a true diplomatic masterpiece: in it Charles Emmanuel III and Maria Theresa allied themselves against Spain and France, but it was foreseen that, if the former were forced into another alliance, the treaty would lose value, provided that he notified the Queen a month in advance. It was an unprecedented clause, which seemed to confirm the Savoyard right to choose the highest bidder between the Empire and France.

On 12 February 1742, Carlo Emanuele appointed Ormea Grand Chancellor, the highest office of the Kingdom, second only to the sovereign. Unlike his predecessors, he had not only the insignia of the toga, but also those of the sword: a privilege also due to the choice to maintain the office of Secretary of State for Foreign Affairs (while he gave up that of the Interior).

In the spring of 1742, at the outbreak of the War of the Austrian Succession, Ormea was sent by Charles Emmanuel II to Modena to convince Duke Francis III to side with the Empire. Faced with his refusal, the Austro-Savoyard troops, who had already occupied the Duchy of Parma and Piacenza, also occupied the Duchy of Modena.
On that occasion, Ormea met Ludovico Antonio Muratori and tried in vain to convince him to enter the Savoy service. He then went to Bologna, where he took the opportunity to commission works from artists such as Giuseppe Maria Crespi and Donato Creti. When Piedmont was invaded by French troops in 1744, Ormea went to the Mondovì area, organizing armed militias that fought against the invaders. This commitment, combined with his already compromised health, undermined his physical condition.

He died in Turin on 29 May 1745 and was buried in the parish church of Cavoretto.

For his role as Grand Chancellor, the University of Turin paid him a solemn funeral in the church of San. Francesco di Paola. As evidence of the bond that united them, Charles Emmanuel III wanted d'Ormea to be depicted in the bas-relief of the Battle of Guastalla, which adorns his tomb in the Basilica of Superga.

== Sources ==
- Bio
- Roberto Gaja, Il marchese d'Ormea, Milano, Bompiani, 1988
- Nobiltà e Stato in Piemonte. I Ferrero d'Ormea, atti del convegno (Torino-Mondovì, 3-5 ottobre 2001), a cura di Andrea Merlotti, Torino, Zamorani, 2003
