= Dauphin Technology =

Defunct American computer company

Dauphin Technology, Inc.
- Type: Public
- Industry: Computers
- Founded: 1988; 38 years ago in Lombard, Illinois
- Founders: Alan Yong; Lucy Yong
- Defunct: 2006; 20 years ago
- Fate: Reverse merged with GeoVax, Inc.
- Products: Laptops; Palmtop PCs; Set-top boxes

Dauphin Technology, Inc., often shortened to Dauphin, was an American computer and electronics company active from 1988 to 2006 and based in Illinois. The company was founded by Alan Yong and Lucy Yong in 1988 for the production of laptop computers. The company soon pivoted to the manufacture of palmtop PCs, releasing the DTR-1, a 486SLC palmtop weighing 2.5 pounds (1.1 kg) and running Windows for Pen Computing, in 1993. The DTR-1 was a flop in the marketplace and was a major factor in Dauphin's bankruptcy in 1995, from which they emerged in 1996. The company offered a more successful palmtop PC in 1998 before pivoting again to the manufacture of set-top boxes in 2001. In 2006, Dauphin reversed merged with GeoVax, Inc., of Atlanta, Georgia.

== History ==
=== Foundation and growth (1988–1992) ===
Dauphin Technology, Inc., was founded in Lombard, Illinois, by Alan Yong and Lucy Yong in 1988 with $1.2 to $1.5 million of startup capital. The company was originally a subsidiary of Dauphin International Trade Center, a trading company founded by the Yongs in the same year. Both Alan and Lucy Yong had emigrated to the United States from their native Malaysia in 1971, after Alan had won a scholarship from the YMCA, with which he paid for his tuition at the George Williams College in Chicago, earning a degree in business administration. After graduating college, the Yongs purchased the Glen Ellyn Restaurant in the eponymous village in downtown Glen Ellyn. While managing the restaurant, Alan Yong conversed with many of his customers who happened to be workers and businesspeople in the city, who were becoming increasingly acquainted with computer systems in their respective industries. Inspired by these conversations, Yong founded Manufacturing and Maintenance Systems, Inc., a maker of ruggedized computer systems for industrial applications, in 1981. In 1988, he founded Dauphin Technology after receiving a business offer from Golden Time, a OEM of laptop computers in Taiwan, who wanted to use Dauphin International Trade Center as a label through which to sell Golden Time's laptops.

Dauphin Technology's first line of laptops, the LapPRO, were IBM PC compatibles based on Intel's 286 and 386 microprocessors. Golden Time of Taiwan was the initial manufacturer of the laptop's case and keyboard, while LMCLTI Inc. of Lionville, Pennsylvania, built the printed circuit boards and populated them with the needed electronic components. Final assembly was performed at Dauphin's Lombard headquarters, which employed between 20 and 30 workers in 1989 and had seven assembly stations. Dauphin's initial production capability of the LapPRO was 3,000 units per month in 1989; the company had 15,000 inquiries for the LapPRO by March that year. In August 1989, the company introduced the LapPRO 386SX, featuring the namesake Intel 80386SX processor. In 1990, Dauphin Technology was reverse acquired by Successo Inc. of Salt Lake City, Utah, in a stock swap that saw Successo adopting the Dauphin name and Dauphin controlling a majority of Successo. In mid-1991, Dauphin earned a multiyear contract from the United States Department of Defense (DoD) to supply the Pentagon with up to $480 million worth of laptops. In late 1991, Dauphin won another contract from the United States Navy to supply the latter with 75,000 units of the LapLINK 386SX worth $86 million, through Sears Business Centers.

Dauphin Technology's Dauphin headquarters and assembly lines were seriously damaged in a fire that occurred in the beginning of August 1992. Despite this, Dauphin were able to finish their contract for LapPRO 386SXes for the Navy and continue their obligations for the DoD. Three months later, Dauphin moved to a 15,500-square-foot building within Lombard. Following the acquisition of Zenith Data Systems by Groupe Bull of France in the early 1990s, Dauphin became the largest independent manufacturer of laptop computers based in Chicago.

=== DTR-1 and Chapter 11 bankruptcy (1993–1997) ===
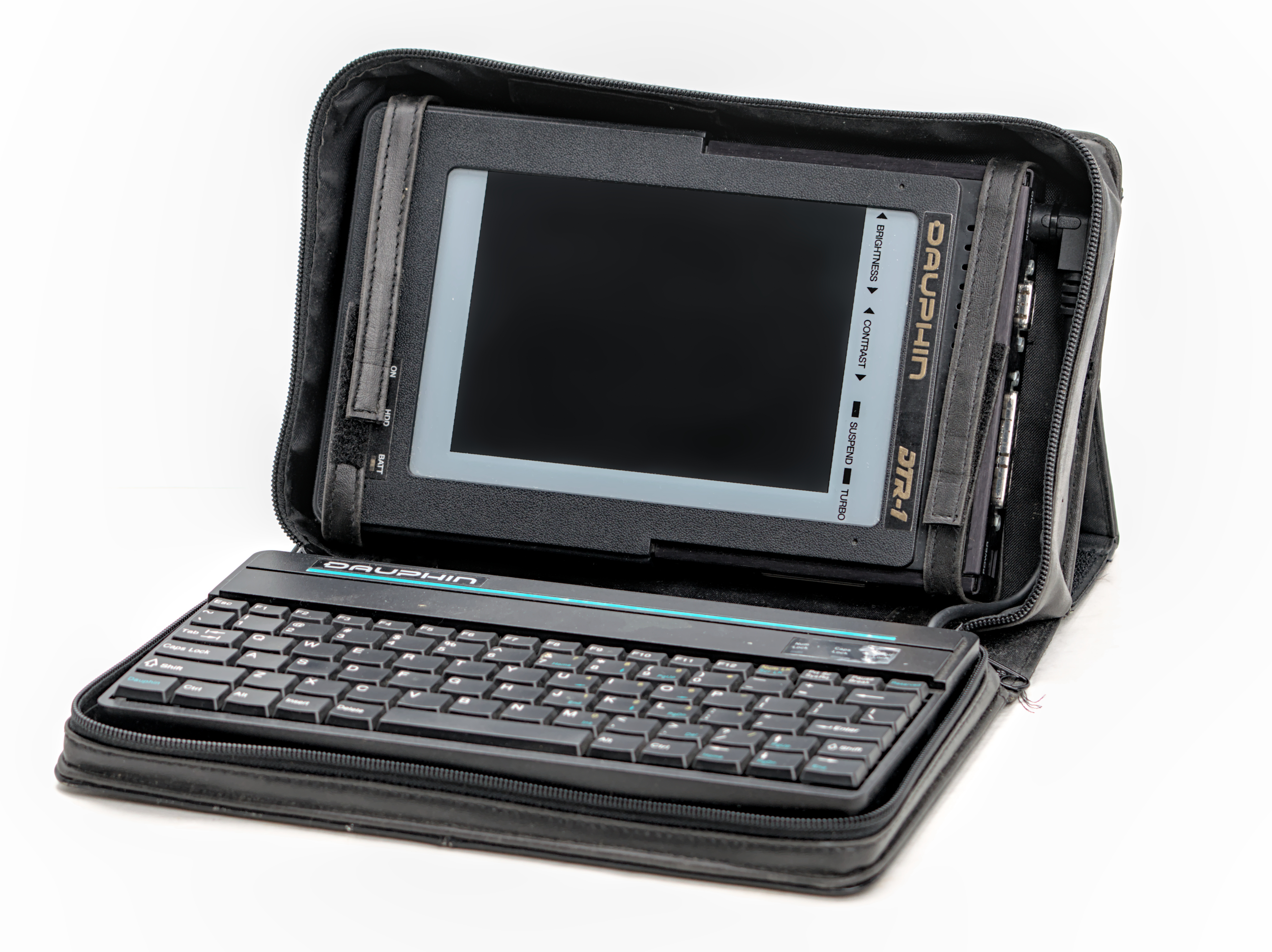
A DTR-1 propped up in its carrying case

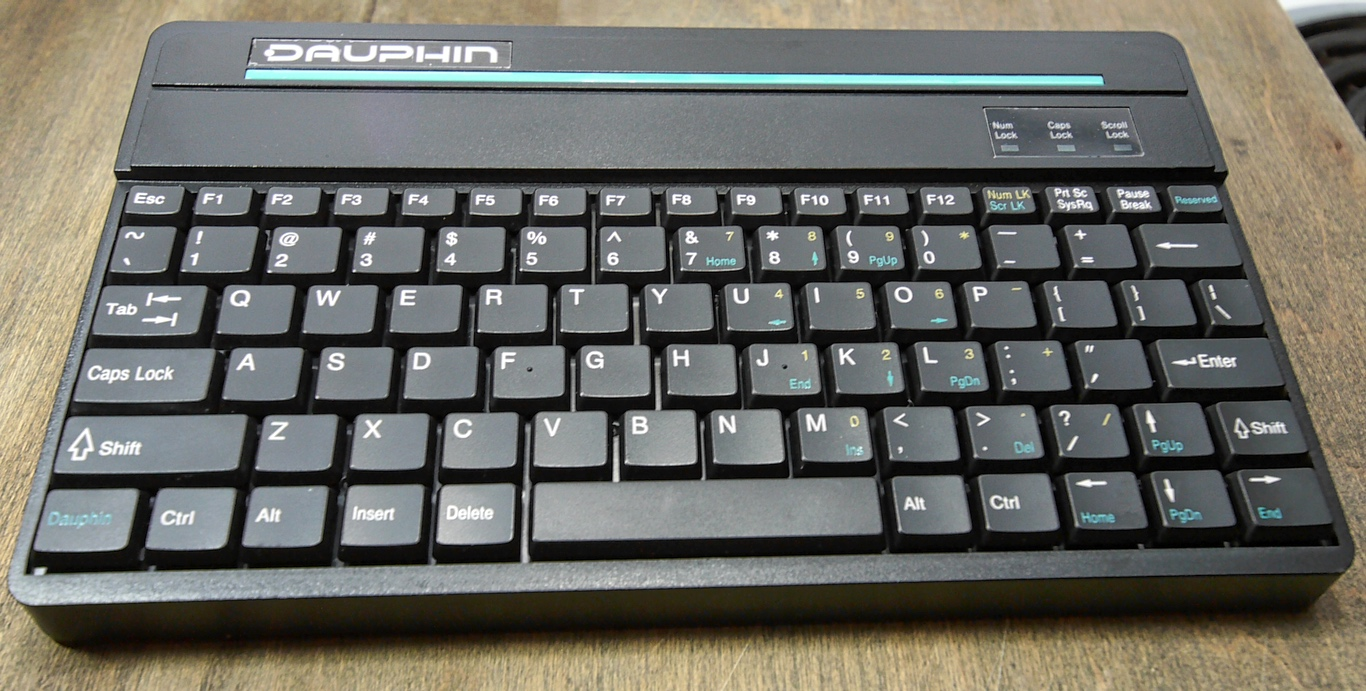
The keyboard of the DTR-1 received criticism from journalists due to its diminutive size.

In February 1993, Dauphin unveiled the DTR-1 (an abbreviation of Desktop Replacement-1), a touchscreen palmtop PC weighing 2.5 pounds (1.1 kg), measuring 9 by 5 by 1.5 inches (22.9 by 12.7 by 3.8 cm), and running Cyrix's Cx486SLC microprocessor and Microsoft's Windows for Pen Computing operating system. The DTR-1 can be used as a more standard subnotebook by placing it within its carrying case, which also houses the computer's included keyboard, or it can be used like a PDA sans keyboard. IBM signed a contract with Dauphin to manufacture the DTR-1 in unused production facilities in Austin, Texas, in May 1993. Hewlett-Packard provided the DTR-1's hard disk drive, which were Kittyhawk microdrive units measuring 1.3 inches in diameter (as opposed to the 2.5-inch diameter drives used in most laptops of the time). The DTR-1 was released in mid-1993 to tepid sales and mixed reviews from technology journalists, who complimented its small stature but found the hardware underpowered and the small keyboard cumbersome to use.

Dauphin incurred significant losses in 1994—by August 1994 the company had raked up $37.1 million in losses in the prior fiscal quarter, while sales plummeted 84 percent to $651,090 in the same quarter, down from $4.2 million from the same period in the previous year. After having lost their contract with the Department of Defense and saddled with debt to IBM, in August 1994 the company laid off about 14 of its 55 employees, and in early January 1995 Dauphin filed for Chapter 11 bankruptcy. The company's remaining employees were laid off, and the company's warehouse was shuttered, as the company became entrenched in bankruptcy court proceedings.

In February 1995, Kevin Koy (formerly the head of VictorMaxx, a seller of virtual reality equipment) and several other investors bought out $750,000 of Dauphin's $40 million debt to IBM and planned a takeover of Dauphin, with Yong set to retain 15 percent ownership of the company as both gratuity and to help his case in bankruptcy court. Yong was then replaced by Andrew Kandalepas as CEO of Dauphin. Although the investors opened up temporary offices in Chicago and rehired many of Dauphin's employees lost to the bankruptcy filing in January 1995, the presence of Yong in the company premises proved thorny for both the rehired employees and the new investors, who claimed they had to keep quiet when making price quotes to outside vendors for fear of reprimand from Yong. As relations deteriorated, Yong threatened to sell his shares of the company, putting Dauphin's planned second initial public offering at risk of being dashed by the SEC. By October 1995, Yong made a truce with the investors to withhold selling shares in the company for two years, in exchange for receiving $140,000 for a portion of his 15-percent stake. Sometime between then and March 1996, Kandalepas bought out Koy and company's stake in the company for roughly $3 million of Kandalepas' own money and that of other Greek-American immigrant businessmen with whom he had forged relationships. Through the efforts of Kandalepas, in March 1996, Dauphin finally emerged from Chapter 11 bankruptcy.

=== Pivot and merger (1997–2006) ===
In February 1997, Dauphin announced their acquisition of R. M. Schutz (RMS), an original design manufacturer of consumer electronics founded in 1981 and based in McHenry, Illinois, for an undisclosed amount. The acquisition was completed in June 1997, with RMS receiving a $750,000 capital infusion and becoming a subsidiary of Dauphin.

By 1998, the company relocated to Palatine, Illinois, and introduced the Orasis (Greek for vision), a palmtop PC based on Intel's Pentium processor clocked at 233 MHz. It measured 7 by 10 inches (180 by 250 mm) and weighed between 3 pounds (1.4 kg) and 5.5 pounds (2.5 kg). In March 1999, BulFon SA, a European telecommunications company, agreed to purchase up to $7 million worth of units of the Orasis for distribution rights in North Macedonia, Bulgaria, Yugoslavia, and several countries of the former Soviet Union. In June 1999, Dauphin received $2.25 million of capital infusion from an anonymous bank. By 2001, Dauphin was manufacturing set-top box for hospitality. In July 2001, Dauphin acquired Suncoast Automation, a maker of interactive cable systems. In December 2001, the company opened European regional offices in Greece.

In 2006, Dauphin, by this point based in Schaumburg, Illinois, reversed merged with GeoVax, Inc., a biotechnology company based in Atlanta, Georgia.
