= List of ambassadors of Austria to Italy =

Ambassadors of Austria to Italy

Ambassador of the Republic of Austria to the Italian Republic
- Coat of arms of Austria

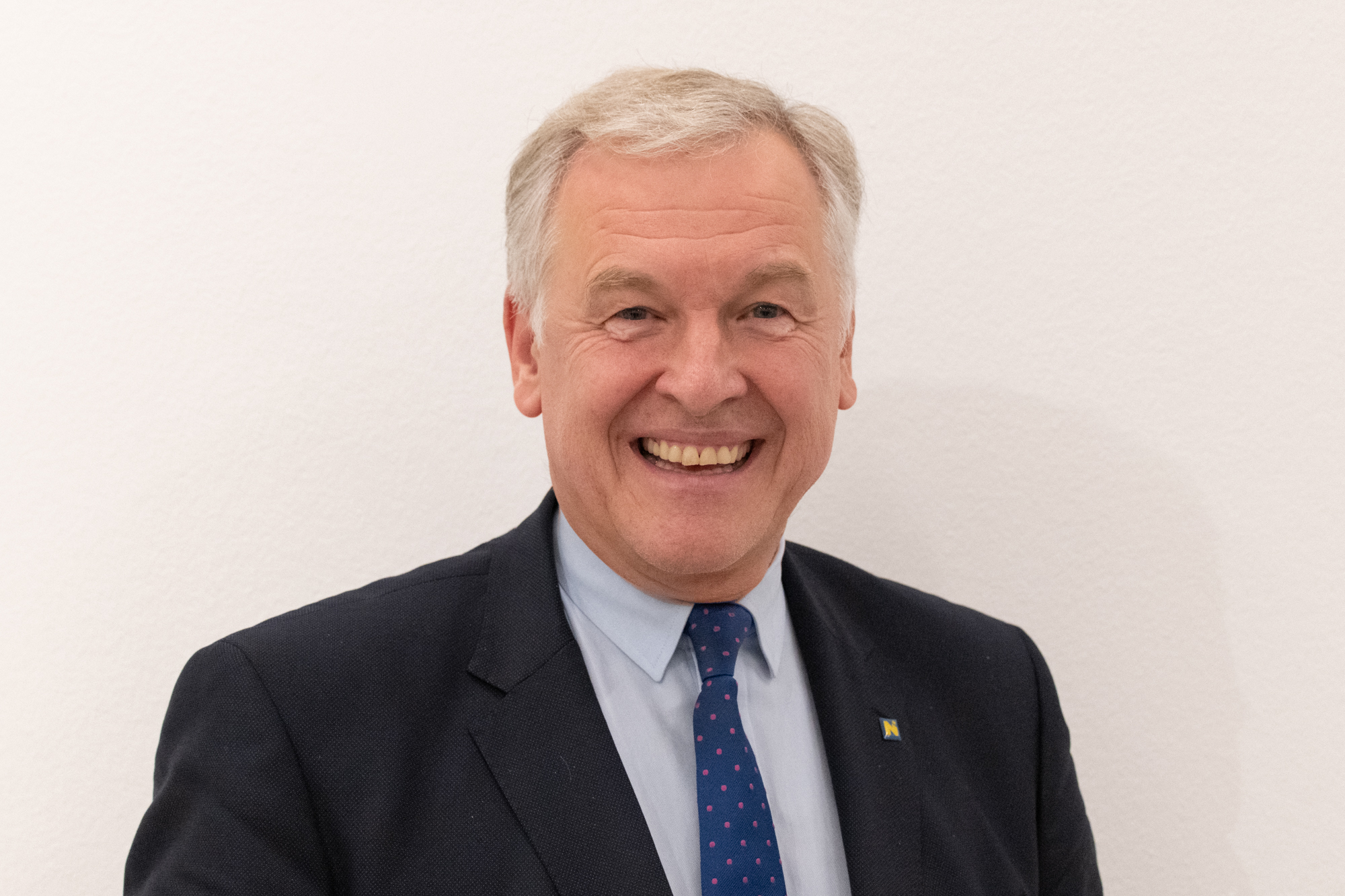
- Incumbent; Martin Eichtinger since 2024
- Ministry of Foreign Affairs; Embassy of Austria
- Style: His Excellency
- Website: Austrian Embassy, Rome

The Ambassador of the Republic of Austria to the Italian Republic is the Republic of Austria's (formerly the Holy Roman Empire, the Austrian Empire and the Austro-Hungarian Empire) foremost diplomatic representative in Italy. As head of Austria's diplomatic mission there, the ambassador is the official representative of the president and government of Austria to the Prime Minister and the government of Italy. The position has the rank and status of an Ambassador Extraordinary and Minister Plenipotentiary and the embassy is located in Rome.

== Heads of mission ==
Image	Name	Term start	Term end	Appointed by	Accredited during	Notes
1866: Establishment of diplomatic relations
	Alois Kübeck von Kübau	December 16, 1866	December 20, 1871	Franz Joseph I	Marco Minghetti	Ambassador
1867: Reconstitution as Austria-Hungary
	Alois Kübeck von Kübau	December 16, 1866	December 20, 1871	Franz Joseph I	Marco Minghetti	
	Felix von Wimpffen	December 20, 1871	July 5, 1876	Franz Joseph I	Urbano Rattazzi	
Heinrich Karl von Haymerle	Heinrich Karl von Haymerle	January 14, 1877	October 8, 1879	Franz Joseph I	Agostino Depretis	
	Felix von Wimpffen	December 8, 1879	May 5, 1882	Franz Joseph I	Benedetto Cairoli	
	Emanuel von Ludolf	May 25, 1882	November 9, 1886	Franz Joseph I	Agostino Depretis	
Karl Ludwig von Bruck	Karl Ludwig von Bruck	December 7, 1886	October 7, 1895	Franz Joseph I	Agostino Depretis	
	Marius Pasetti-Angeli von Friedenburg	October 7, 1895	March 7, 1904	Franz Joseph I	Francesco Crispi	
Heinrich von Lützow	Heinrich von Lützow	March 7, 1904	March 4, 1910	Franz Joseph I	Giovanni Giolitti	
Kajetan von Mérey	Kajetan von Mérey	March 4, 1910	May 23, 1915	Franz Joseph I	Luigi Luzzatti	
1915: Breakdown of relations as a result of World War I
1919: Establishment of diplomatic relations
	Rémy Kwiatkowsky	March 13, 1921		Michael Mayr		Envoy
	Lothar Egger-Möllwald					Envoy
Anton Rintelen	Anton Rintelen	September 1, 1933	July 25, 1934	Engelbert Dollfuss	Benito Mussolini	Envoy
	Alois Vollgruber	1934	1936	Engelbert Dollfuss	Benito Mussolini	Envoy
	Egon Berger-Waldenegg	1936	1938	Kurt Schuschnigg	Benito Mussolini	Envoy
1938 to 1945: Interruption of relations due to the Anschluss of Austria to the German Reich
1946: Establishment of diplomatic relations
	Adrian Rotter	1946	1947	Leopold Figl	Ferruccio Parri	
	Johannes Schwarzenberg	1947	1955	Leopold Figl	Ferruccio Parri	
	Max Löwenthal-Chlumecky	1955	1972	Julius Raab	Antonio Segni	
	Heribert Tschofen	1972	1974	Bruno Kreisky	Giulio Andreotti	
	Rudolf Ender	1974	1976	Bruno Kreisky	Aldo Moro	
	Georg Schlumberger	1977	1978	Bruno Kreisky	Aldo Moro	
	Heinz Laube	1979	1982	Bruno Kreisky	Aldo Moro	
	Friedrich Frölichsthal	1982	1991	Fred Sinowatz	Bettino Craxi	
	Emil Staffelmayr	1991	1997	Franz Vranitzky	Giulio Andreotti	
	Günter Birbaum	1997	2001	Viktor Klima	Romano Prodi	
	Alfons M. Kloss	2001	2007	Wolfgang Schüssel	Silvio Berlusconi	
	Christian Berlakovits	2008	2013	Werner Faymann		
	Gerda Vogl	2013	2015	Werner Faymann	Mario Monti	Chargé d'affaires
	René Pollitzer	April 2015	2020	Werner Faymann	Matteo Renzi	
	Jan Kickert	July 2020		Sebastian Kurz	Giuseppe Conte	
Martin Eichtinger	Martin Eichtinger	2024				

== Ambassadors to Italian States (before 1861) ==
Italy around 1796

Italy around 1843

In the following Habsburg and Austrian ambassadors in the Italian states before the Unification of Italy in 1861. In the Cisalpine Republic, Baron Sigismund von Moll (1759–1826) headed the Austrian embassy from 4 May 1802 to 23 April 1805. Napoleon Bonaparte founded the Kingdom of Italy (from 1805 to 1814) as the successor to the Cisalpine Republic, took over the presidency and crowned himself King of the Italians on 26 May 1814. On 23 April 1814, Eugène de Beauharnais capitulated to Austrian troops, who then occupied Veneto and Lombardy. The Congress of Vienna awarded the Kingdom of Lombardy–Venetia to the Habsburg monarchy.

=== Ambassadors in Genoa ===
Habsburg, or Austrian, ambassadors in the Republic of Genoa, from 1797 Ligurian Republic (until 1805).

1704: Establishment of diplomatic relations

- 1721–1722: Antonio Ildaris
- 1726–1741: Giovanni Guicciardi
- 1766–1766: Jacopo di Durazzo
- 1794–1797: Giovanni di Girola, Chargé d'Affaires
- 1803–1805: Peter von Giusti

=== Ambassadors in Modena ===
Habsburg, or Austrian, ambassadors in the Duchy of Modena, also accredited in the Duchy of Parma.

- 1815–1816: Ferdinando Marescalchi
- 1821–1848: Supervised by the embassy in Florence
- 1848–1852: Giovanni di Allegri
- 1852–1854: Carl von Lederer, Chargé d'Affaires
- 1854–1857: Eduard von Lebzeltern-Collenbach
- 1857–1859: Ludwig von Paar

=== Ambassadors in Naples ===
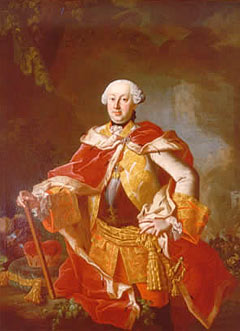
Paul II Anton, Prince Esterházy

Habsburg, or Austrian, ambassadors in the Kingdom of Naples, from 1815 Kingdom of the Two Sicilies.

1751: Establishment of diplomatic relations

- 1751–1752: Paul II Anton Esterházy de Galántha
- 1752–1754: Alfons Gomez da Sylva (Charge d'Affaires)
- 1754–1758: Karl Joseph von Firmian
- 1758–1764: Leopold von Neipperg
- 1764–1770: Ernst Christoph von Kaunitz-Rietberg
- 1770–1771: Anton Binder von Krieglstein
- 1771–1773: Franz Joseph von Wurmbrand-Stuppach
- 1773–1778: Johann Joseph Maria von Wilczek
- 1778–1784: Anton von Lamberg-Sprinzenstein
- 1784–1787: Karl von Richecourt
- 1787–1789: Johann Amadeus Franz von Thugut
- 1789–1791: Norbert Hadrava (Charge d'Affaires)
- 1791–1792: Francesco di Ruspoli
- 1792–1801: Franz von Esterhazy
- 1801–1805: Franz von Cresceri (Charge d'Affaires)
- 1805–1807: Aloys von Kaunitz-Rietberg
- 1807–1815: Franz von Cresceri
- 1815–1820: Ludwig von Jabłonowski
- 1820–1821: Karl von Menz (Charge d'Affaires)
- 1821–1829: Karl Ludwig von Ficquelmont
- 1829–1830: Karl von Menz (Charge d'Affaires)
- 1830–1844: Ludwig von Lebzeltern
- 1844–1848: Felix zu Schwarzenberg

1848–1849: Interruption of relations

- 1849–1860: Anton Stephan von Martini
- 1860–1864: Emerich Széchenyi

1864: Dissolution of the embassy

=== Ambassadors in Sardinia-Piedmont ===
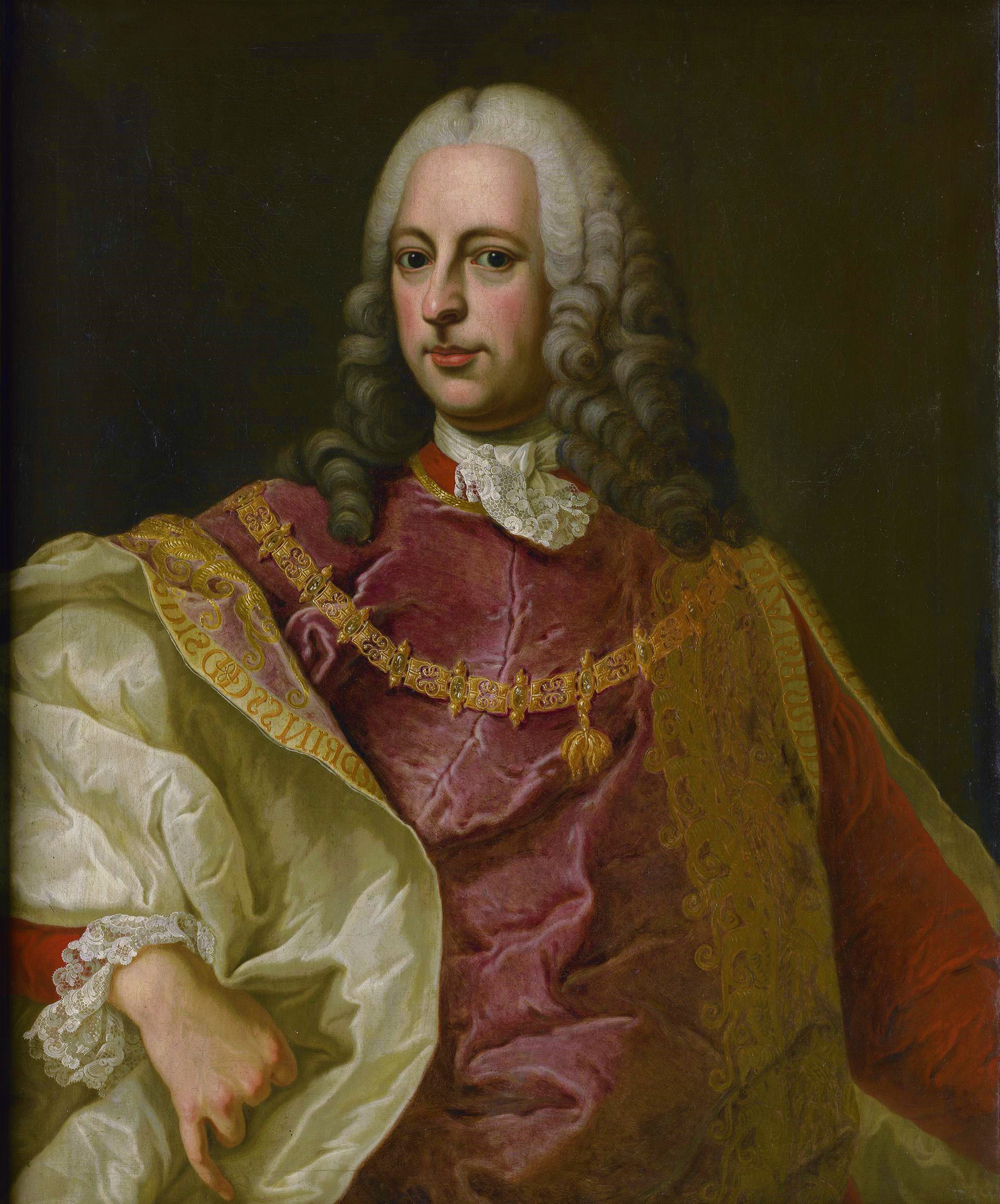
Count Friedrich August von Harrach-Rohrau

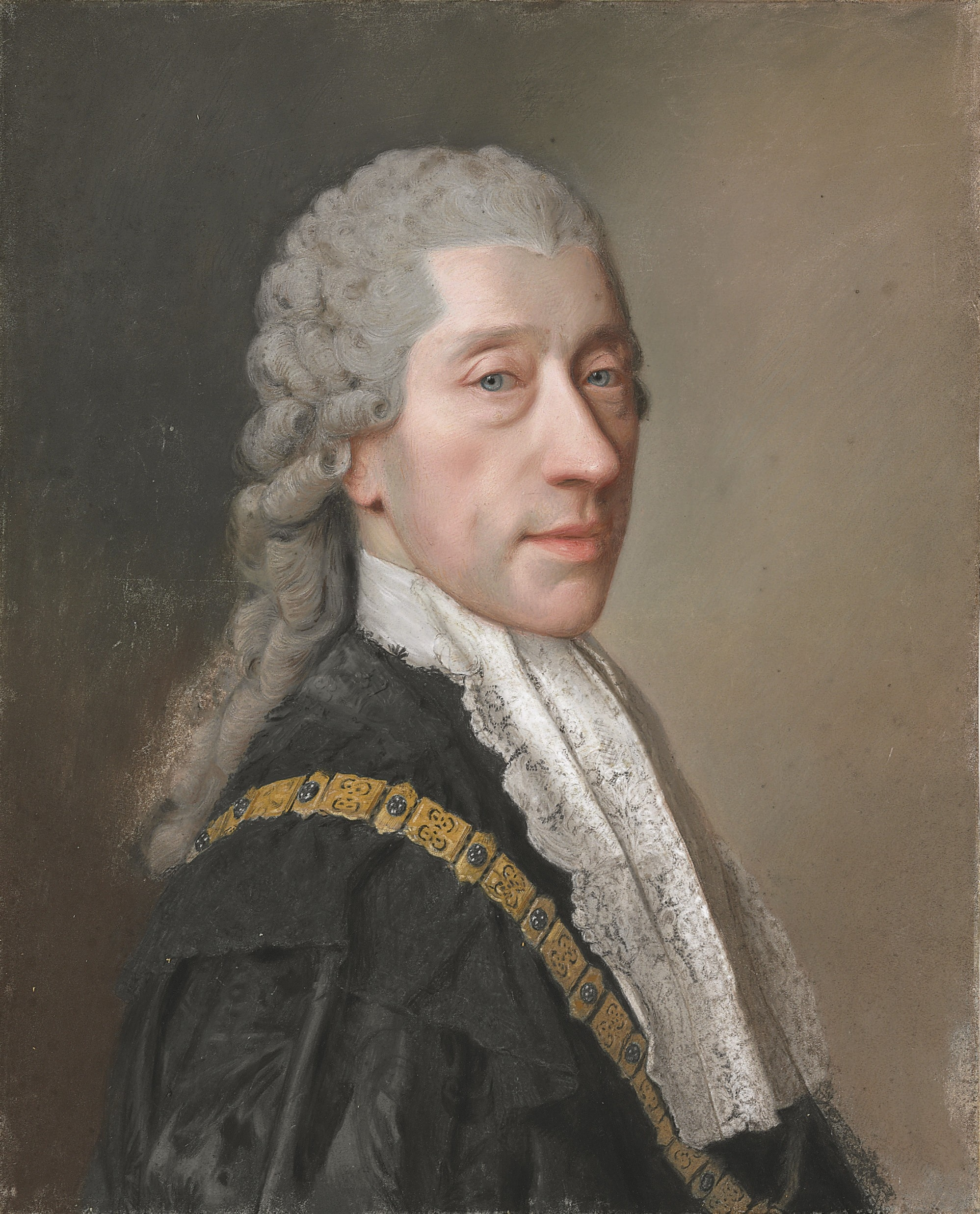
Wenzel Anton, Prince of Kaunitz-Rietberg

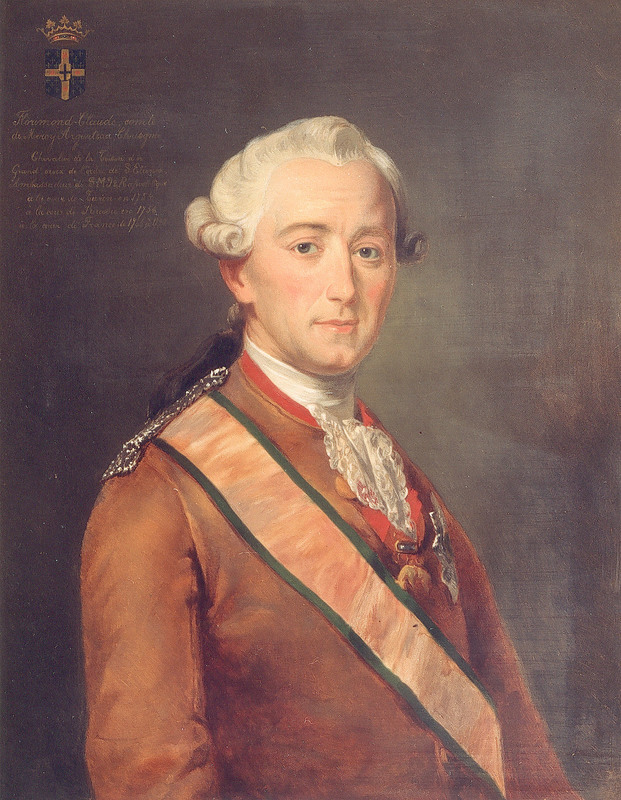
Florimond Claude, Comte de Mercy-Argenteau

Habsburg, or Austrian ambassadors, in the Duchy of Savoy, from 1720 Kingdom of Sardinia-Piedmont.

1705: Establishment of diplomatic relations

- 1726–1727: Friedrich August von Harrach-Rohrau
- 1727–1730:
- 1730–1733: Viktor von Philippi
- 1733–1741:
- 1741–1742: Ferdinand Ludwig von der Schulenburg-Oeynhausen
- 1742–1742: Ferdinand de Bartholomei
- 1742–1744: Wenzel Anton Kaunitz
- 1744–1749: Heinrich Hyacinth von Naye und Richecourt
- 1749–1750: Adeodat Joseph Philipp du Beyne de Malechamp
- 1750–1751: Anton Theodor von Colloredo-Wallsee
- 1751–1753: Adeodat Joseph Philipp du Beyne de Malechamp (Envoy)
- 1754–1760: Georg Barré (Envoy)
- 1754–1760: Florimond Claude von Mercy-Argenteau
- 1760–1762: Vacant
- 1762–1771: Johann Sigismund von Khevenhüller-Metsch
- 1775–: Philipp von Welsperg-Raitenau
- 1775–: Anton Henriquez de Ben (Envoy)
- 1776–1778: Anton Franz Lamberg-Sprintzenstein
- 1778–: Anton Henriquez de Ben (Envoy)
- 1780–1784: Karl von Breuner-Enckevoirth
- 1784–1797: Maurizio Marchese di Gherardini
- 1797–1800: Theodor de Lellis Envoy
- 1800–1814:
- 1814–1815: Adam Albert von Neipperg
- 1815–1820: Ludwig von Starhemberg
- 1820–1823: Franz Binder von Krieglstein
- 1823–1826: Rudolf von Lützow
- 1826–1831: Ludwig Senfft von Pilsach
- 1831–1835: Heinrich Franz von Bombelles
- 1835–1838: Lazar Ferdinand von Brunetti
- 1838–1843: Felix zu Schwarzenberg
- 1843–1844: Friedrich Franz von Thun und Hohenstein
- 1844–1848: Karl Ferdinand von Buol-Schauenstein
- 1848–1849: Breakdown of diplomatic relations
- 1849–1853: Rudolf Apponyi von Nagy-Appony
- 1853–1857: Ludwig von Paar

=== Ambassadors in Tuscany ===
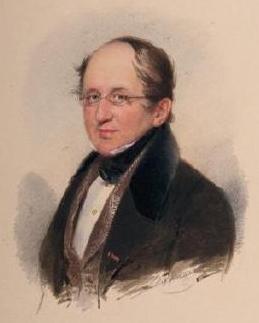
Louis Philippe de Bombelles by Moritz Daffinger

Habsburg, or Austrian, ambassadors in the Grand Duchy of Tuscany.

- 1722–1726: Francesco Lisoni, Chargé d'Affaires
- 1726–1735: Girolamo Caimo
- 1735–1743: Francesco Lisoni, Chargé d'Affaires
- 1743–1758: Vacant
- 1758–1765: Antoniotto Botta Adorno
- 1765–1769: Vacant
- 1771–1772: Johann Josef von Wilczek
- 1773–1798: Josef Veigl, Chargé d'Affaires
- 1798–1800: Siegmund Veigl, Chargé d'Affaires
- 1800–1803: Vacant
- 1803–1804: Filippo di Ghisilieri
- 1804–1807: Michael von Colli-Marchini

1807 to 1814: Interruption of relations due to the French annexation of Tuscany

- 1814–1815: Johann Rudolf von Buol-Schauenstein
- 1815–1820: Anton von Apponyi
- 1820–1821: Adam von Ficquelmont
- 1821–1829: Louis Philippe de Bombelles
- 1830–1832: Franz Josef von Saurau
- 1832–1836: Friedrich von Senfft
- 1836–1842: Adam Reviczky von Revisnye
- 1842–1844: Karl Schnitzer von Meerau, Chargé d'Affaires
- 1844–1847: Philipp von Neumann
- 1847–1848: Karl Schnitzer von Meerau, Chargé d'Affaires

1848 to 1850: Interruption of relations

- 1850–1860: Carl von Hügel

26 October 1866: Breaking off diplomatic relations

=== Ambassadors in Venice ===
Habsburg, or Austrian, ambassadors to the Republic of Venice (until 1797)

1494: Establishment of diplomatic relations

- 1715–1726: Johann von Colloredo-Waldsee
- 1728–1732: Josef Bolagno
- 1732–1743: Ludovico Principe Pio di Savoia
- 1743–1747: Josef von Rathgeb
- 1747–1753: Giovanni di Prié
- 1754–1764: Philipp Josef von Orsini-Rosenberg
- 1764–1784: Giacomo Durazzo
- 1773–1785: Francesco Simone Corradini
- 1785–1790: Karl von Breuner-Enckevoirth
- 1790–1796: Karl von Breuner-Enckevoirth
- 1796–1797: Karl von Humburg

== See also ==
- Foreign relations of Austria
- Foreign relations of Italy
