= Ludwig von Schulenburg-Oeynhausen =

Austrian diplomat

Count Ferdinand Ludwig von der Schulenburg-Oeynhausen

Austrian Ambassador to Sardinia-Piedmont
- In office 24 March 1741 – 22 February 1742
- Preceded by: Viktor von Philippi
- Succeeded by: Ferdinand de Bartholomei

Personal details
- Born: 1699
- Died: 16 January 1754 (aged 54–55) Vienna
- Spouse: Countess Maria Anna von Kottulinsky (m. 1740; died 1754)
- Parent(s): Count Raban Christoph von Oeynhausen; Baroness Sophia Juliana von der Schulenburg

Count Ferdinand Ludwig von der Schulenburg-Oeynhausen (1699 – 16 January 1754) was an Imperial General-Feldzeugmeister, a diplomat and founder of the "Schulenburg-Oeynhausen" line.

== Early life ==
He was the son of the Hanoverian Oberjägermeister, Count Raban Christoph von Oeynhausen (d. 1749) and his wife, Baroness Sophia Juliana von der Schulenburg (1668–1753), daughter of Gustav Adolf von der Schulenburg. The Imperial General-Feldwachtmeister Johann Georg Moritz von Oeynhausen (1697–1764) was his brother and Prussian Lieutenant General Adolph Friedrich von der Schulenburg his cousin.

== Career ==
Through his maternal uncle, the Venetian Field Marshal Matthias Johann von der Schulenburg, he entered Venetian service at a young age. During the Ottoman–Venetian War (1714–1718), he and his uncle took part in the successful defense of Corfu. There he stood out for his bravery and, through the mediation of Prince Eugene, was appointed as an officer in the Austrian Infantry Regiment (Count Traun). With the regiment he fought in the 1719 campaign in Sicily against the Spanish in the Battle of Francavilla and the Siege of Messina.

In 1724, the Field Marshal allowed Oeynhausen to use the name Schulenburg-Oeynhausen and in 1740 gave him an annual pension of 3,500 guilders in his will. Field Marshal Traun was also impressed by the young man and he rose quickly through the ranks, becoming Colonel in the regiment by 1733.

In 1734 he fought in the War of the Polish Succession in Italy and was taken prisoner after the Battle of Bitonto (25 May 1734). After his release, he fought in the Battle of San Pietro on 29 June 1734. He was promoted to Sergeant-General on 30 March 1735 and was given command of the Infantry Regiment No. 21. On 19 February 1736 he was also made a full Chamberlain.

In the Austro-Turkish War (1737–1739), he commanded a brigade, distinguished himself in the Battle of Grocka and was promoted to Lieutenant-Field Marshal on 18 August 1739. He returned to Vienna and married there.

When the War of the Austrian Succession began, he returned to Italy. He had been commissioned by Empress Maria Theresa to win King Charles Emmanuel of Sardinia as an ally. He brought about the Convention of Turin, which he signed with the Sardinian minister, the Marquis d'Ormea, on 1 February 1742. As a result, Sardinia declared war on Spain.

Schulenburg joined the Traun Corps in Modena. In 1743 he distinguished himself in the Battle of Campo Santo, where he commanded the right wing. He was then sent to Germany, where he fought first in the Alsace against the French and then in Bohemia against the Prussians in the autumn. In Bohemia he was given a Corps of 17 companies of grenadiers, 2,000 fusiliers and 800 horsemen to force a way across the Elbe. A first attempt on 15 November 1744 at Przelautsch failed. On 19 November, the crossing was successful at Teltschitz (Telčice), which the Prussian Lieutenant Colonel Wedel had been able to prevent for a long time with only 400 men. This crossing made the Prussian situation in Bohemia untenable and they had to withdraw faster than planned.

In 1745 he was transferred back to Italy. There he was appointed Feldzeugmeister on 13 July 1745 and took over the overall command of the Austrian troops from Prince Lobkowitz. He continued together with the Sardinian King Charles Emmanuel III the fight against the Spanish. But Schulenburg and his army were pushed back further by the Spanish. The army of Schulenburg and Charles Emmanuel had to split up in September, because they had no longer sufficient forces. Schulenburg then concentrated on defending Lombardy. The Spanish took advantage of this weakness and defeated the Sardinians on 27 September 1745 at the Battle of Bassignano. The help of the Austrians came too late, so Schulenburg was ordered back to Vienna and replaced by Joseph Wenzel I, Prince of Liechtenstein. But he returned to Italy in 1746. Schulenburg was given the task of conquering Genoa, but this failed. Schulenburg was again recalled to Vienna and never again assigned to field service.

He retired to Graz.

== Personal life ==
On 10 October 1740, Oeynhausen married Countess Maria Anna von Kottulinsky (1707–1788), widow of Prince Joseph Johann Adam, Prince of Liechtenstein in Vienna, against the wishes of all her relatives. The couple had two children:

- Ferdinand Ludwig von der Oeynhausen-Schulenburg (1745–1824), Colonel in the army of the Electoral Palatinate; he married Marie Françoise de Vincens, Countess of Causans in 1797.
- Antoinette von der Oeynhausen-Schulenburg (1747–1812), who married Lieutenant Field Marshal Count Franz de Paula Josef von Daun, in 1767. After his death in 1785, she married Count August Anton von Attems in 1788.

In 1753 he converted to Catholicism and died on 16 February 1754 in Vienna from the after-effects of a fall from his horse on the march to Genoa. He was buried in the Schottenkirche, Vienna. In 1769 his widow bought the estates of Ober-Waltersdorf and Tribuswinkel in Lower Austria and established a fideicommissum for her son.

== Sources ==
- Bernhard von Poten (1887). "Oeynhausen, Ferdinand Ludwig Graf von" . Allgemeine Deutsche Biographie (in German). Vol. 25. Leipzig: Duncker & Humblot. pp. 28–30.
- Europäisches genealogisches Handbuch, 1774, S. 229
- Karl Hopf, Historisch-genealogischer Atlas seit Christi Geburt bis auf unsere Zeit, p. 33 Family tree
- Stammtafeln des Schulenburgischen Geschlechts, Anhang, Band 2, S. 49ff
- Julius Graf von Oeynhausen, Hermann Grotefend, Geschichte des Geschlechts von Oeynhausen, Band 3, p. 434

Diplomatic posts
Preceded by Viktor von Philippi	Habsburg Ambassador to Sardinia-Piedmont; 1741–1742	Succeeded by Ferdinand de Bartholomei
