= Convention of Turin =

1742 treaty between Austria and Sardinia

The Convention of Turin was a 1742 agreement between Austria and Sardinia signed in the Sardinian capital of Turin. It created a military alliance between the states, directed principally against Spain. It was signed by the Sardinian Chief Minister the Marquis D'Ormea and the Austrian envoy Count Schulenburg.

Following the outbreak of the War of the Austrian Succession and the attack on Austria by a coalition of states including France, Prussia, Bavaria and Saxony - their possessions in Italy began to look vulnerable. Spain had ambitions in the area, driven by Elisabeth Farnese who wished to secure Italian kingdoms for her sons. Austria tried to persuade Sardinia to join with them against Spain, although this was resisted by the Sardinian leadership.

Sardinian attempts to remain neutral were undermined by apparent Spanish threat's to their independence. After a large Spanish force was shipped across the Mediterranean and was poised for offensive operations in Italy, Sardinia moved towards concluding agreements with both the British and Austrians. The Sardinians initially made specific territorial requests from Austria as a payment for their co-operation, but later abandoned this for vaguer promises for new territory in Lombardy. The agreement was concluded on 1 February 1742. The agreement was later expanded on by the Treaty of Worms (1743).

== Bibliography ==
- Browning, Reed. The War of the Austrian Succession. Alan Sutton Publishing, 1994.
- Owen, John B. The Rise of the Pelhams. Methuen, 1957.
