= FVT =

FVT may refer to:

- Final value theorem
- Fire Victim Trust
- Flash vacuum thermolysis
- Future Vision Technologies
