= Viktor von Philippi =

Austrian diplomat

Count Viktor von Philippi

Ambassador to Sardinia-Piedmont
- In office 1730–1733
- Preceded by: Friedrich August von Harrach-Rohrau (in 1727)
- Succeeded by: Ferdinand Ludwig von der Schulenburg-Oeynhausen (in 1741)

Personal details
- Born: 1675 Piedmont, Savoyard state
- Died: 24 October 1739 (aged 63–64) Vienna
- Spouse: Marie Christine Rebekka von Malenthein (m. 1720; died 1739)

Viktor von Philippi (1675 – 24 October 1739) was an Imperial Habsburg Field Marshal (Feldzeugmeister) and diplomat.

== Career ==
Little is known about the beginning of his career. He served as lieutenant colonel and as adjutant general to Prince Eugene in 1703, and was promoted to Colonel in his regiment in 1711. In 1717, he became commander of the Bayreuth Dragoon Regiment (later Hussar Regiment No. 15). During the Siege of Belgrade in 1717, he had the honor of being sent to the fortress to conclude the surrender. Afterwards, on 24 August, he and the regiment accompanied the Turkish garrison across the Morava as a guard.

After the war he was promoted to Major General on 16 October 1723 and, in 1727, became commander of the 12th Dragoon Regiment.

He subsequently held a diplomatic post. In November 1732, he arrived as Imperial Envoy to the Royal Sardinian court in Turin, but was recalled in 1733 and promoted to Lieutenant Field Marshal on November 8, 1733. During the War of the Polish Succession, he participated in the Rhine Campaign with the main army. He was appointed General of Cavalry on 26 April 1735, and Field Marshal on 22 April 1737.

=== Austro-Russian–Turkish War ===
In the Seventh Turkish War of 1737, he commanded the advance to Nissa and formed the vanguard of the main army under Field Marshal Seckendorf. In 1738, he was given command of the Cavalry. After Seckendorf's dismissal, he became Commander-in-Chief ad interim, a position he then voluntarily left to Field Marshal Count Olivier Wallis.

During the campaign, he succeeded in capturing Nissa on 25 July 1737, and in capturing the mountain fortress of Usiya in Bosnia on 26 September 1737. He led the left wing in the Battle of Kornia on 4 July 1738, and was in command of the Battle of Mehadia on 15 July. He subsequently fell seriously ill and briefly left the Army. He returned for the 1739 campaign and was again commander-in-chief of the Cavalry. Shortly thereafter, however, he returned to Vienna due to illness, where he died on 24 October 1739.

Among his contemporaries he was considered a very knowledgeable and skilled officer, but was also described as scheming, cunning and prone to intrigue.

== Personal life ==
In 1720, Philippi married the Spanish lady-in-waiting Marie Christine Rebekka von Malenthein (1681–c. 1747).

Count von Paar died in Vienna on 24 October 1739.
