= Krieglstein =

Krieglstein is a German language habitational surname. Notable people with the name include:

- Eugen Binder von Krieglstein (1873–1914), Austrian journalist
- Kerstin Krieglstein (1963), German neuroscientist
