= Combat Hospital =

2011 Canadian-American medical drama television series

- Intertitle from the pilot
- Also known as: The Hot Zone
- Genre: Medical drama
- Created by: Jinder Oujla-Chalmers; Daniel Petrie, Jr.; Douglas Steinberg
- Starring: Deborah Kara Unger; Michelle Borth; Elias Koteas; Terry Chen; Arnold Pinnock; Luke Mably; Ali Kazmi; Ellen Wong
- Countries of origin: Canada; United States
- Original language: English
- No. of seasons: 1
- No. of episodes: 13

Production
- Executive producers: Daniel Petrie Jr.; Jennifer Kawaja; Julia Sereny; Gub Neal; Justin Thomson-Glover; Patrick Irwin; Simon Vaughan
- Running time: 42 minutes
- Production companies: Artists Studio; Lookout Point; Sienna Films; Shaw Media

Original release
- Network: Global (Canada); ABC (US)
- Release: June 21 – September 6, 2011

Combat Hospital is a medical drama television series, filmed in Toronto, that debuted on Global in Canada and ABC in the United States on June 21, 2011. Its final episode was broadcast on September 6, 2011. The series was known for a time by the working title The Hot Zone before reverting to its original title, Combat Hospital.

ABC announced on October 24, 2011, that it would not be renewing Combat Hospital for a second season. On December 16, 2011, Shaw Media confirmed that Combat Hospital would not be renewed for another season due to their inability to find a new broadcast partner after ABC had opted not to continue with the series earlier that fall.

== Plot ==
Set in Kandahar, Afghanistan in 2006, the series revolves around the life and work of doctors and nurses from the International Security Assistance Force, specifically from Canada, the United States, the United Kingdom, Australia, Germany, and other allied countries at a military hospital.

== Cast ==
=== Main cast ===
- Michelle Borth as Canadian Forces Medical Officer Major Rebecca Gordon, Canadian Army
- Elias Koteas as Canadian Forces Medical Officer Commanding Officer Colonel Xavier Marks, Canadian Army (based on Major Marc Dauphin)
- Terry Chen as United States Army Captain (Doctor) Bobby Trang, trauma team leader
- Arnold Pinnock as Canadian Forces Nursing Officer, Chief of Nursing, Commander Will Royal, Royal Canadian Navy
- Deborah Kara Unger as Australian Army psychiatrist Major Grace Pedersen
- Luke Mably as British contract neurosurgeon Doctor Simon Hill
- Ali Kazmi as Chaplain David Nedayal

=== Recurring cast ===
- Ellen Wong as Canadian Forces Nursing Officer Major Suzy Chao, Canadian Army
- Hamza Jeetooa as Vans, Afghan translator
- Gord Rand as Canadian Forces Medical Technician and Regimental Sergeant-Major, Chief Warrant Officer Graham Kelly, Canadian Army
- Karan Oberoi as United States Air Force Pararescue Jumper Talwar Mehra
- Dwain Murphy as United States Air Force Pararescue Jumper Terrel Ford
- Husein Madhavji as United States Air Force Lieutenant Colonel Max Prakash, Orthopedic Surgeon
- Adam Beach as Snake Eater/Joe
- Trenna Keating as Sgt. Hannah Corday
- Sam Kalilieh as Dr. Tarzi
- Lisa Berry as Capt. Pam Everwood, RN

== Production ==
Jinder Oujla-Chalmers came up with the concept for Combat Hospital in 2008 and, together with Douglas Steinberg, pitched the show to Canwest (now Shaw Media). After the show was picked up for development, Oujla-Chalmers travelled to Afghanistan to conduct first-hand research at a small, forward-deployed military hospital. Oujla-Chalmers was able to use real images taken during the visit and stories heard from medical personnel to add realism to the show. Oujla-Chalmers and Steinberg brought the show to Sienna Films, who agreed to produce it and set up funding as a Canadian-British co-production with Artists Studio and Lookout Point in the UK.

Canwest announced on July 9, 2010, that Combat Hospital was slated for production in the 2011–12 season. The budget for the first season was reported to be $2 million per episode. During pre-production, Morocco was considered as a location for filming the series. Production on the series began in March 2011. The series was filmed at the former Consumers Glass factory in Etobicoke, Ontario. The property had been converted into a 17,187 square metre indoor/outdoor set that recreated portions of the NATO Role 3 Hospital at Kandahar Airfield, as well as its surroundings. Filming was scheduled to continue until July 27, 2011. Post-production work was done in London. The first season has 13 episodes.

== Broadcast ==
Combat Hospital was broadcast in Canada on Global. Throughout its initial broadcast the series was consistently performing better than CTV's Flashpoint and Global's Rookie Blue, it was often the most watched scripted programme of the week in Canada. While only the twelfth episode was shown in the U.S. on August 30 both the eleventh and twelfth episodes were shown in Canada. In September 2011, Shaw Media began repeating the series on both Showcase and Showcase Diva.

On December 16, while filming the New Year's Day special of Royal Canadian Air Farce, cast member Arnold Pinnock confirmed that Shaw Media had cancelled Combat Hospital as they were faced with the inability to find another broadcast partner to offset the expenses of the show.

== International distribution ==
In early January 2011 ABC was in talks to purchase broadcast rights to the then-untitled project. Later, on January 20, 2011, it was reported that ABC had indeed purchased broadcast rights to the project. On March 25, 2011, Shaw Media announced that the series would be simulcast in the United States by ABC. On August 24, 2011, ABC announced that they were skipping the eleventh episode of season 1 and moving the season finale date by one week, from September 13, 2011, to September 6, 2011. ABC announced on October 24, 2011, that they would not be commissioning a second season of Combat Hospital.

Outside of North America the series was distributed by Sony Pictures Television.

Combat Hospital was shown in Hungary on PRO4 starting on April 1, 2012. In July 2013, it was shown in Catalonia on TV3 as Hospital de campanya.

== Episodes ==
No.	Title	Directed by	Written by	Original release date	CAN viewers (millions)
1	"Welcome to Kandahar"	Iain B. MacDonald	Story by : Jinder Oujla-Chalmers & Douglas Steinberg and Daniel Petrie, Jr. Teleplay by : Daniel Petrie, Jr.	21 June 2011	1.963
Canadian trauma surgeon Major Rebecca Gordon and American trauma team leader Captain Robert 'Bobby' Trang arrive at the NATO Role 3 Medical Unit at Kandahar Airfield.
2	"Enemy Within"	Iain B. MacDonald	Gub Neal	28 June 2011	1.550
Dr Gordon and Captain Trang treat an Afghan National Army soldier for a serious infection that neither of them has encountered before. When another patient presents with the same symptoms a quarantine is declared.
3	"It's My Party"	Christopher Menaul	Sara B. Cooper	5 July 2011	1.525
With the blood supply depleted Colonel Marks calls for direct donors as Dr Gordon operates on a soldier with severe gunshot wounds. Major Pedersen inquires about the circumstances of the shooting and the wounded soldier's friends' stories are inconsistent. Photojournalist Jessica Draycott (Tia Carrere) rekindles her romance with Simon.
4	"Wrong Place at the Right Time"	Christopher Menaul	Angus Fraser	12 July 2011	1.481
Simon hitches a ride on a Medevac on a routine supply run when he finds out that it passes over the farm he has bought. However, they must stop and rescue a wounded person. Meanwhile, Rebecca must conduct a brain surgery following Simon's directions via satellite phone. Bobby and Major Pedersen evaluate the mental condition of an Air Force officer.
5	"Hells Bells"	Stephen Reynolds	Adam Pettle	19 July 2011	1.513
A civilian wedding party is caught in Taliban crossfire and treated at Role 3; Marks gets a troubling call from home and discusses it with Pedersen; and Rebecca and Bobby sit in on Pedersen's group-therapy session, and Rebecca wonders if she shared too much.
6	"Inner Truth"	Stephen Reynolds	Sara B. Cooper	26 July 2011	1.576
Seven injured soldiers anxiously anticipate the arrival of their lucky charm, 19-year-old Pvt. Henry Flax; Rebecca makes a confession to Simon. A female soldier (Christina Cox) and patient of Dr. Pedersen approaches her romantically.
7	"Reckless"	Christopher Menaul	Annmarie Morais	2 August 2011	1.409
Under intense investigation, Rebecca doubts her decision to withhold treatment from a soldier, which may have resulted in his death.
8	"On the Brink"	Christopher Menaul	Simon Block	9 August 2011	1.304
Bobby makes a decision that creates controversy between the doctors and nurses.
9	"Shifting Sands"	Helen Shaver	Angus Fraser	16 August 2011	1.375
One of Vans' friends comes under suspicion when he is injured by a bomb.
10	"Reason to Believe"	Helen Shaver	Story by : Jinder Oujla-Chalmers; Teleplay by : Lara Azzopardi & Will Pascoe	23 August 2011	1.240
An Army chaplain (Camille Sullivan) is forced to deal with her lapse of faith when she is ordered to hold vigil with Simon during a surgery.
11	"Brothers in Arms"	Paul Unwin	Sara B. Cooper	30 August 2011	1.210
A prank gone wrong reveals Simon's painful past; Pedersen must question children about a suicide bomber.
12	"Triage"	Paul Unwin	Gub Neal	30 August 2011	1.548
When Colonel Marks is injured in an explosion away from the base, Rebecca takes control of triage and struggles to make a life-threatening decision that could affect the status of a critically injured soldier.
13	"Do No Harm"	Ken Girotti	Daniel Petrie, Jr.	6 September 2011	1.325
While working at a women's clinic, Captain Pam Everwood, Grace, Rebecca, Suzy, and Major Hasti Samizay are attacked by an unknown gunman. Suzy is killed and Grace injured, forcing her to go back home. Simon decides to go back to take care of his brother. Rebecca reveals to Trang that she kissed Simon. He says that things should not be left unsaid, which forces Rebecca to go to the airport to meet Simon. They kiss and she tells him to come back soon.

== Reception ==
Overall, the series received mixed to negative reviews. John Doyle of The Globe and Mail said that the show is neither the new M*A*S*H for its lack of "snarky chat about the stupidity of war and governments that encourage war" nor is it Grey's Anatomy-on-the-front-lines as there are no "lurid romantic entanglements". Doyle goes on to say, "It's the horrors of war and the awfulness of a combat hospital seen emphatically through the prism of TV drama." In concluding his review Doyle said, "In the matter of Afghanistan and military life there, if you want a gruelling experience, watch the news. Combat Hospital is the entertaining version."

Matthew Gilbert of The Boston Globe found the show "is completely divorced from anything resembling real life." He said the premise is "exciting and, to some extent, incendiary" but that with "amateurish acting and paint-by-numbers writing" Combat Hospital and Rookie Blue "are summer filler of the laziest kind."

David Wiegard of the San Francisco Chronicle found Combat Hospital "makes a pretty compelling attempt" at portraying "the bloody reality of war" while also having all of the typical characters of a medical drama.

== Home releases ==
Sony Pictures Home Entertainment released Combat Hospital on DVD in the United States on March 6, 2012, as part of their manufacture-on-demand service. It is not available for purchase in Canada.

Mill Creek Entertainment announced the re-release of the series on DVD.
