= Siege of Genoa (1747) =

Austrian siege on the Republic of Genoa

- Part of War of the Austrian Succession
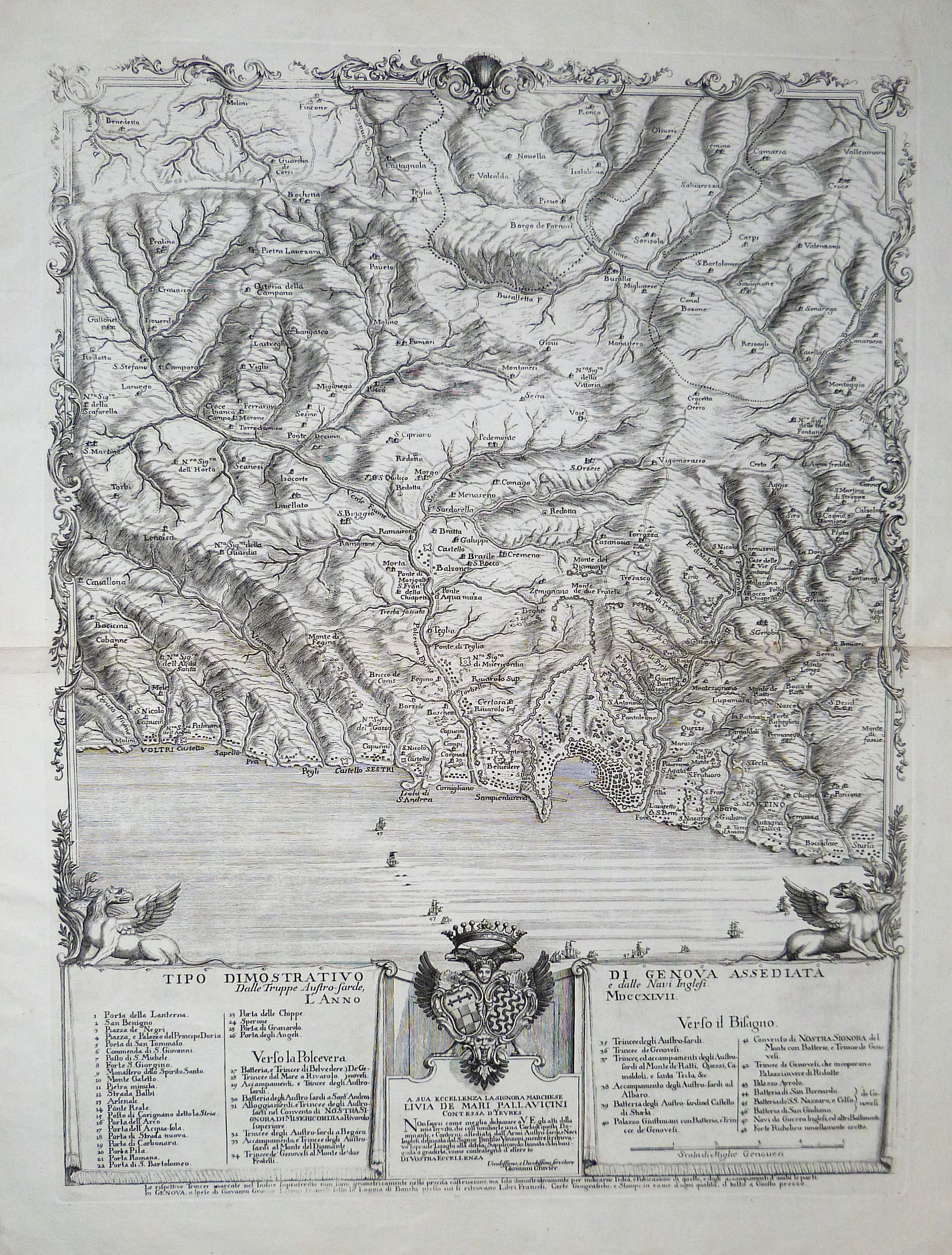
- Plan of Genoa during the 1747 siege.
Date	April – June 1747
Location	Genoa, Republic of Genoa (present-day Italy) 44°24′26″N 8°56′02″E
Result	Franco-Spanish-Genoese victory

Belligerents
Habsburg Monarchy; Kingdom of Sardinia	Republic of Genoa; Kingdom of France; Kingdom of Spain

Commanders and leaders
Siege force (Habsburg monarchy) Count Schulenburg (Kingdom of Sardinia) Gian Luca Pallavicini	Garrison (Kingdom of France) General Boufflers; Relief Force (Kingdom of France) Marshal Belle-Isle (Spain) General Las Minas

Strength
(Habsburg monarchy) 24,000 men, (Kingdom of Sardinia) 6,000 men	(Republic of Genoa) 10,000 garrison (Kingdom of France) 6,000 garrison
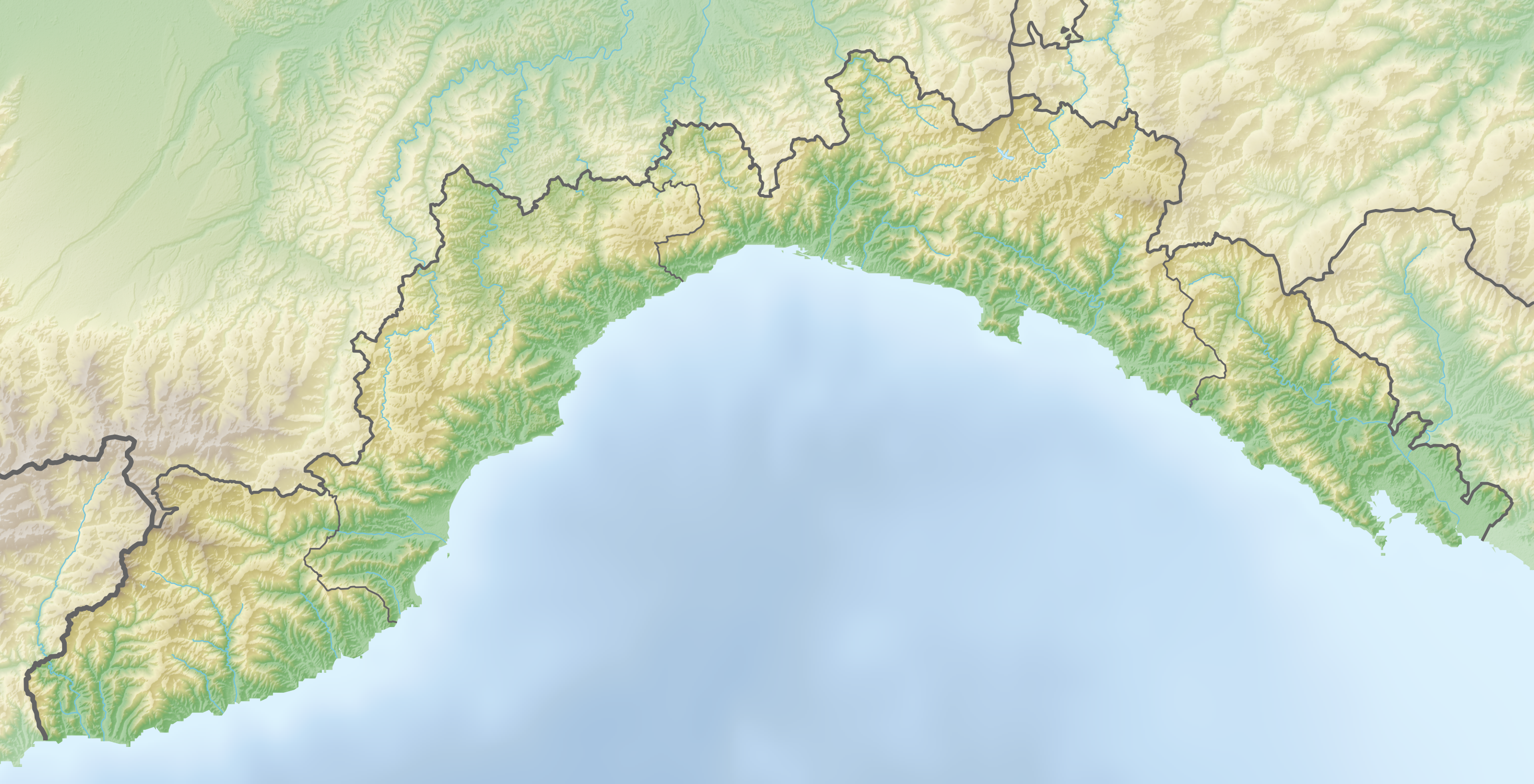
- Location within Liguria Siege of Genoa (1747) (Italy)

The siege of Genoa took place in 1747 when an Austrian army under the command of Count Schulenburg-Oeynhausen launched a failed attempt to capture the capital of the Republic of Genoa.

== Prelude ==
The Austrians had captured and then lost Genoa the previous year, and made it the central objective of their strategy for 1747. They decided on attacking Genoa before they would consider further operations against Naples or an invasion of France, especially because the Invasion of the Provence in winter 1746-47 had been a failure.

Maximilian Browne was appointed commander of all Imperial forces in Italy, and Count Schulenburg of the Imperial forces that would attack Genoa. The plan was to starve Genoa into submission, and in order to cut off all approaches by sea, the British fleet began a naval blockade in February.

== The Siege ==
Schulenburg's force reached the outskirts of the city in April, but realising they needed more troops they waited until twelve battalions of infantry from their Sardinian allies arrived in June. The delay allowed the French and Spanish to send reinforcements to the city under Joseph Marie de Boufflers to bolster the garrison. A major attack on the city was launched on 21 May, but the defenses of Genoa held, despite the fact that Boufflers contracted smallpox, and would die in early July.

The approach of a strong Franco-Spanish force under Marshal Belle-Isle and General Las Minas, pressured the Sardinians to withdraw to try to defend a possible threat to Milan, and Schulenberg then abandoned the siege blaming the Sardinians. The failed siege led to recriminations between Vienna and Turin with both complaining to their British allies in London about the alleged betrayal of the other.

== Bibliography ==
- Lodge, Sir Richard. Studies in Eighteenth Century Diplomacy 1740-1748. John Murray, 1930.
- Browning, Reed. The War of the Austrian Succession. Alan Sutton Publishing, 1994.
