= Dauphinois =

Dauphinois is a French word meaning "of Dauphiné", referring to the historical French region of the Dauphiné (lit. 'of the dolphin', referring to the region's heraldic animal). It may refer to:

- Any thing or person related to or originating from the historic French region of the Dauphiné
- The Arpitan or Franco-Provençal language
- Gratin dauphinois, a potato dish from the Dauphiné
- Alumni of the Paris Dauphine University

== See also ==
- Dolphin
- Dauphin (disambiguation)
