= Harriet Robinson =

American vaccine researcher

Harriet Latham Robinson
- Education: Swarthmore College (BA); Massachusetts Institute of Technology (PhD)
- Scientific career
- Fields: Molecular Biology, Virology, Vaccinology
- Workplaces: Worcester Foundation for Biomedical Research University of Massachusetts Chan Medical School Emory University GeoVax, Inc.
- Doctoral advisor: James E. Darnell Jr

Harriet Latham Robinson is an American vaccine researcher who is founder and Chief Scientific Officer Emeritus at GeoVax. She is the former Chief of Microbiology and Immunology at the Yerkes National Primate Research Center and Asa Griggs Candler Professor of Microbiology at Emory University. Her research considered HIV vaccine development. She is a Fellow of the American Association for the Advancement of Science.

== Early life and education ==
Robinson (née Latham) born in 1938, was an undergraduate student at Swarthmore College. As a college graduate, she visited the Soviet Union as a Russian-English speaking guide for the 1959 cultural exchange exhibition, USA. Her doctoral research at the Massachusetts Institute of Technology addressed the movement of newly synthesized messenger RNA in HeLa cells. Post doctoral studies were at the University of California, Berkeley where she acquired the avian leukosis sarcoma virus model for retroviruse-induced cancers.

== Research and career ==
In 1977, she joined the Worcester Foundation for Biomedical Research where her work using avian leukosis viruses in chickens was instrumental in demonstrating cancer induction by insertional mutagenesis. This work, a collaborative endeavor with the laboratories of Susan Astrin and John Coffin, led to her appointment in 1998 as Professor of Pathology at the University of Massachusetts Medical Center. The work with avian leukosis sarcoma viruses also provided the foundation for her pioneering studies on recombinant DNA vaccines. Working with the laboratory of Bernie Moss, she combined her novel DNA vaccines with boosts of recombinant poxvirus vaccines to raise high levels of targeted vaccine responses. In 1999, She moved to the Yerkes National Primate Research Center at Emory University to facilitate testing her candidate HIV vaccines in non-human primate models.

Robinson co-founded GeoVax in 2001. The company worked with the National Institutes of Health to move the AIDS Vaccines her team had developed into Phase 1 and 2A human trials. Her vaccine regimen included priming with a DNA expressing non-infectious HIV-like particles and boosting with a recombinant modified vaccinia Ankara virus also expressing non-infectious HIV-like particles. The vaccine elicited both antibody and white blood cells. In 2007, she was named a Fellow of the American Association for the Advancement of Science.

In 2008, Robinson joined GeoVax as Senior Vice President. In 2010 she was promoted to Chief Scientific Officer.

== Selected publications (245 total) ==
- Amara, RR; Villinger, F; Altman, JD; Lydy, SL; O'Neil, SP; Staprans, SI; Montefiori, DC; Xu, Y; Herndon, JG; Wyatt, LS; Candido, MA; Kozyr, NL; Earl, PL; Smith, JM; Ma, HL; Grimm, BD; Hulsey, ML; Miller, J; McClure, HM; McNicholl, JM; Moss, B; Robinson, HL (2001). "Control of a mucosal challenge and prevention of AIDS by a multiprotein DNA/MVA vaccine". Science. 292: 69–74. doi:10.1126/science.1058915. PMID 11393868.
- E F Fynan; Webster, Robert; D H Fuller; J R Haynes; J C Santoro; Robinson, Harriet (1993). "DNA vaccines: protective immunizations by parenteral, mucosal, and gene-gun inoculations". Proceedings of the National Academy of Sciences of the United States of America. 90 (24): 11478–82. Bibcode:1993PNAS...9011478F. doi:10.1073/pnas.90.24.11478. PMC 48007. PMID 8265577. Wikidata Q24563751.
- D M Feltquate; S Heaney; Webster, Robert; Robinson, Harriet (1997). "Different T helper cell types and antibody isotypes generated by saline and gene gun DNA immunization". Journal of Immunology. 158 (5): 2278–2284. PMID 9036975. Wikidata Q34416715.
- Goepfert, PA; Elizaga, ML; Sato, A; Qin, L; Cardinali, M; Hay, CM; Hural, J; DeRosa, SC; DeFawe, OD; Tomaras, GD; Montefiori, DC; Xu, Y; Lai, L; Kalams, SA; Baden, LR; Frey, SE; Blattner, WA; Wyatt, LS; Moss, B; Robinson, HL (2011). "Phase 1 safety and immunogenicity testing of DNA and recombinant modified vaccinia Ankara vaccines expressing HIV-1 virus-like particles". J Infect Dis. 203: 610–9. doi:10.1093/infdis/jiq105. PMC 3072720. PMID 21282192.
- Goepfert, PA; Elizaga, ML; Seaton, K; Tomaras, GD; Montefiori, DC; Sato, A; Hural, J; DeRosa, SC; Kalams, SA; McElrath, MJ; Keefer, MC; Baden, LR; Lama, JR; Sanchez, J; Mulligan, MJ; Buchbinder, SP; Hammer, SM; Koblin, BA; Pensiero, M; Butler, C; Moss, B; Robinson, HL (2014). "Specificity and 6-month durability of immune responses induced by DNA and recombinant modified vaccinia Ankara vaccines expressing HIV-1 virus-like particles". J Infect Dis. 210: 99–110. doi:10.1093/infdis/jiu003. PMC 4072895. PMID 24403557.

== Personal life ==
After post-doctoral training, Robinson had a ten-year break (1967 to 1977) to raise three sons.
