= Charles Dauphin =

French painter

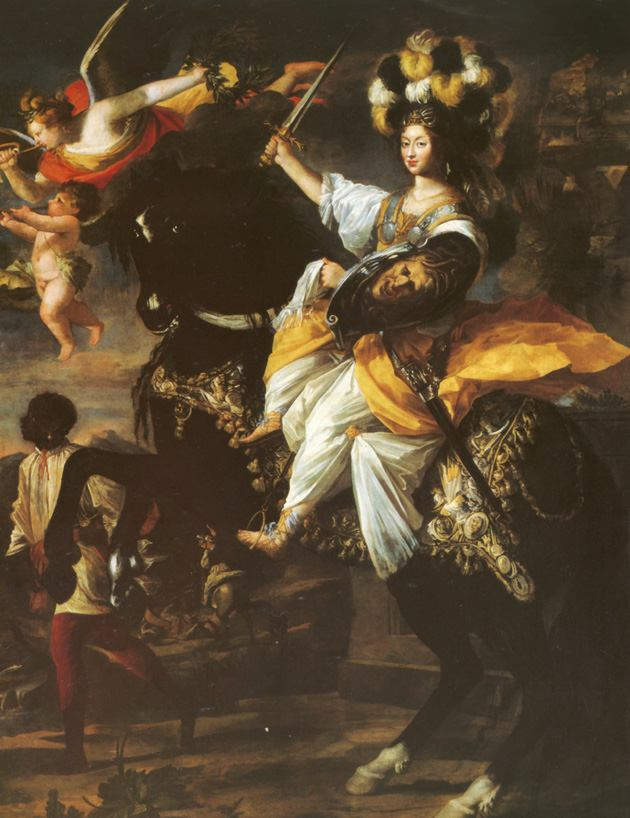
- Christine Marie of France, Duchess of Savoy as Minerva, c. 1630
- Born: Charles Claude Dauphin; 1615/1620; Nancy, Kingdom of France
- Died: 1677; Turin, Duchy of Savoy
- Education: Simon Vouet
- Known for: Painting
- Movement: Baroque

Charles Claude Dauphin or Dofin, called in Italian Delfino (1615/1620 – 1677), was a French painter of historical subjects and portraits. He was born in the duchy of Lorraine and lived most of his adult life in the Savoyard state.

== Biography ==
=== Early life and education ===
He was born in Nancy, Lorraine, Holy Roman Empire. He learned the rudiments of painting in his hometown, but the wars that ravaged Lorraine from 1635 forced him to seek refuge in Paris. By about 1640, he had joined in Paris the studio of Simon Vouet. There he worked alongside François Tortebat and Michel Dorigny. In June 1647, he married Marie Du Mouchet, by whom he had two daughters. No works from this period have been identified, perhaps confused with the production of other studio members.

=== In Turin ===
When Vouet died in 1649, his studio dispersed. Dauphin went to Turin about the year 1652, and from 1658 he worked for the Prince of Carignano. From then on, he worked exclusively for the House of Savoy at Turin and in the churches there. He distinguished himself both in portraits of princes, as well as in allegories and mythologies (Royal Palace of Turin) and in altarpieces (in San Francesco da Paola), combining Flemish schemes and styles with the decorativism adopted by the Carlones and the Recchis.

After the death of his wife, Dauphin remarried to Lucrezia Giugali, by whom he had several children. By 1660 he was working for the Savoy Court, working for the Great Room and the Room of the Dignitaries' in the Royal Palace of Turin in 1661. A Crucifix was done for Christine of France in 1662 and at about the same time, the artist took part in a series of equestrian portraits with the characters in pairs, for the Palace of Venaria, giving them the three most sustained examples in which the Van Dyck stamp, generic, is overpowered by the show of worldly French style, In the meanwhile in 1664 three paintings for San Francesco da Paola followed, somewhat unequal in their pictorial presentation. In the same period Dauphin participated with Jan Miel in the illustration of Emanuele Tesauro's sumptuous work, Del Regno d'Italia sotto i barbari (published in Turin in 1663).

=== Maturity ===
In 1664, Miel, his main competitor, died, leaving Dauphin unchallenged at the forefront of Turin's art scene from that moment until his death. Among the works of this period the frescoes on the ceilings of the Grooms' Room and the Pages' Room in the Royal Palace of Turin stand out. Other ceilings of the Royal Palace have been destroved. The ceiling at the Palace of the City is intact with the canvas of the Miracle of The Host, of 1663, in particularly brilliant colours.

Dauphin's fame spread as far as Lyon (where Johann Jacob Thourneysen realised engravings based on his paintings) and even to Paris (around 1675-76, the Marquis of Pomponne commissioned a Rape of the Sabine Women from him). In 1670 he was requested to do five paintings for an alcove of the Duke's lover, Madamigella de Marolles; in this room one of the Recchis also collaborated in the decoration. Worthy of mention also is the large canvas of St. Paul begging (Istituto San Paolo, Turin) which has a distinctive « romanisant » Academism with a feeling of Jansenist puritanism.

Dauphin died in Turin in 1677, apparently without having accumulated great wealth, as his widow continued to receive subsidies from the Prince of Carignano in the following years.

== Gallery ==
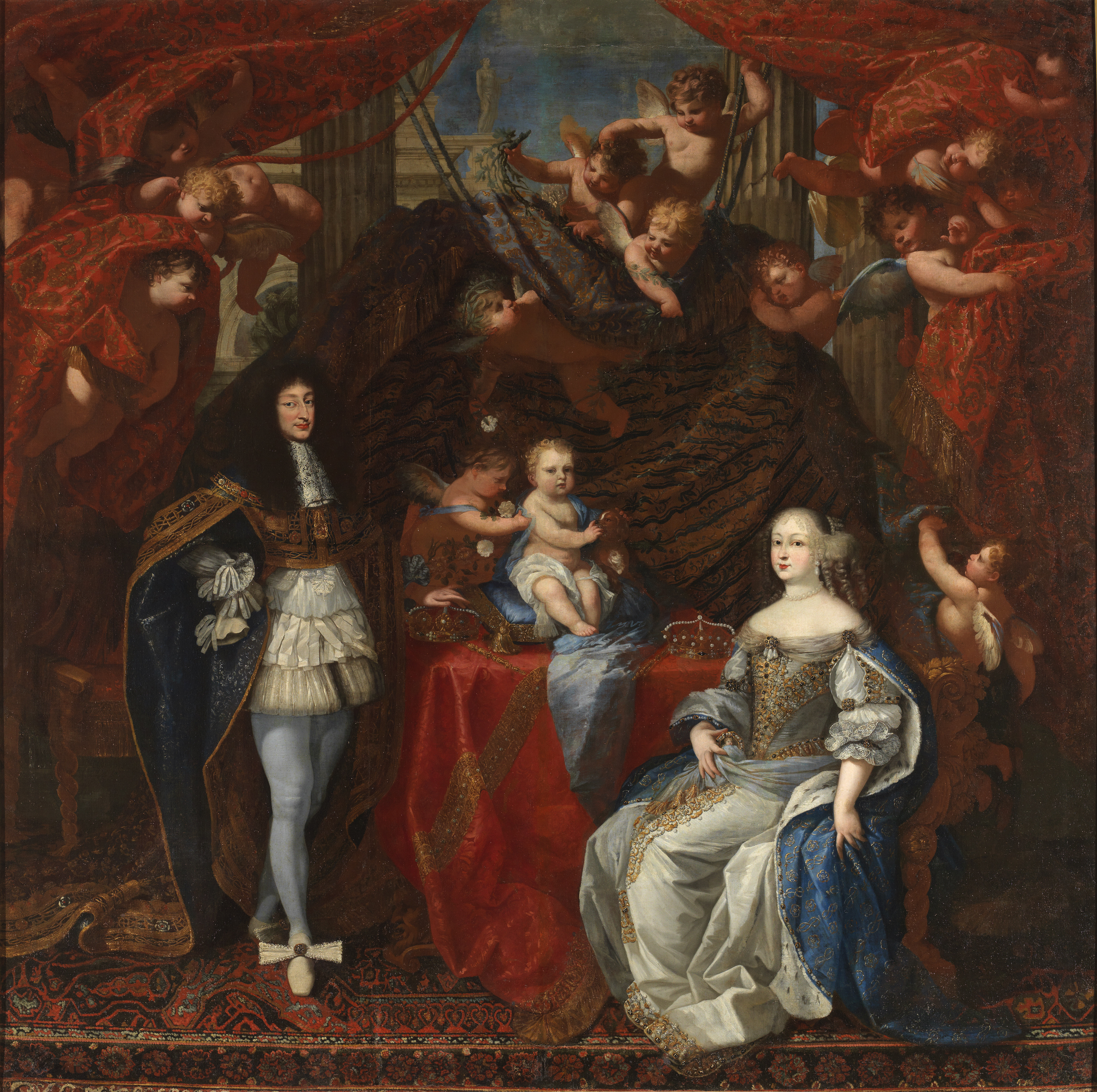
Charles Emmanuel II of Savoy and his family, oil on canvas, Museo del Prado, Madrid

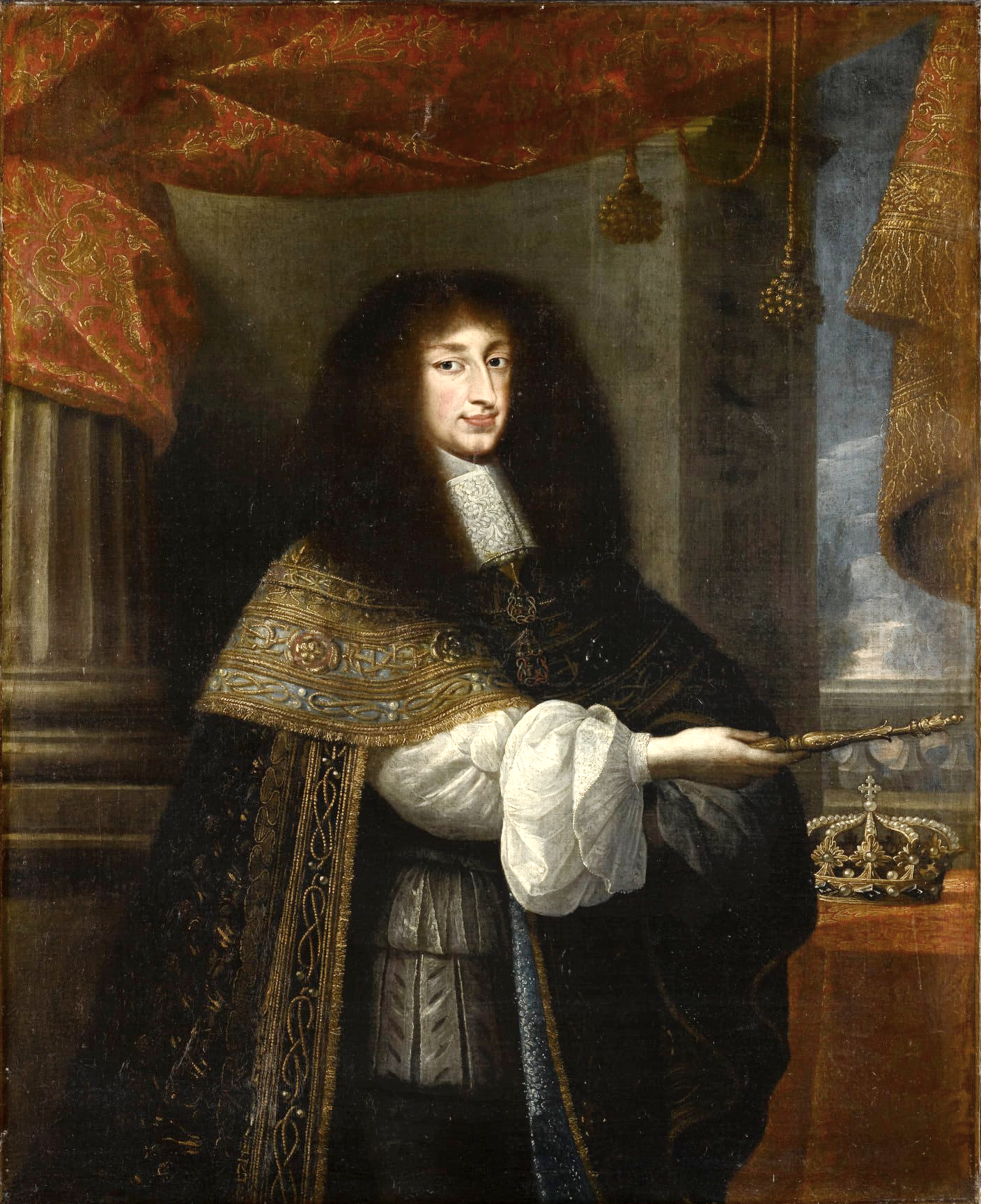
Portrait of Charles Emmanuel II of Savoy, oil on canvas, Château d'Aulteribe

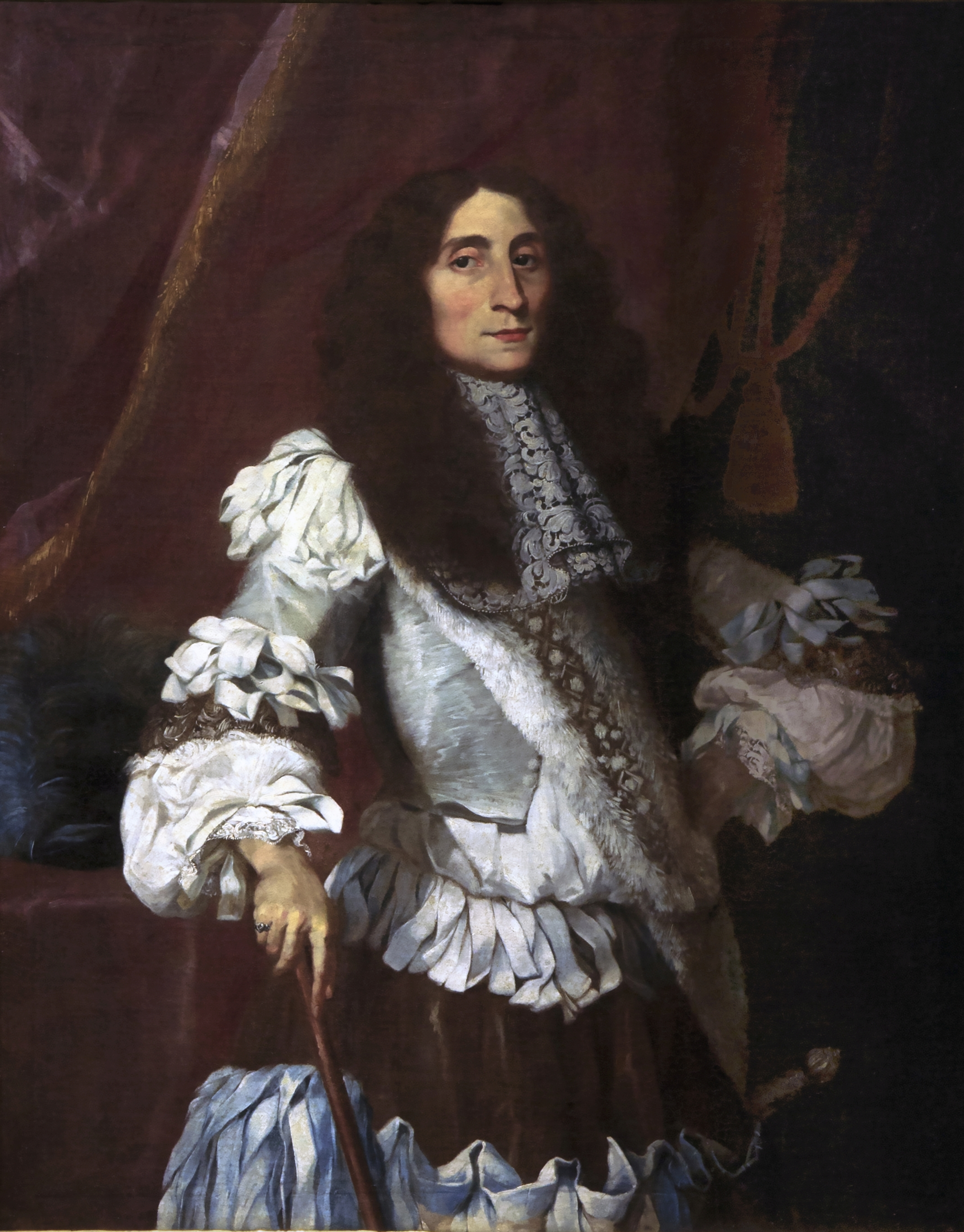
Portrait of Giovanni Battista Balbo Bertone, oil on canvas, Palace of Venaria

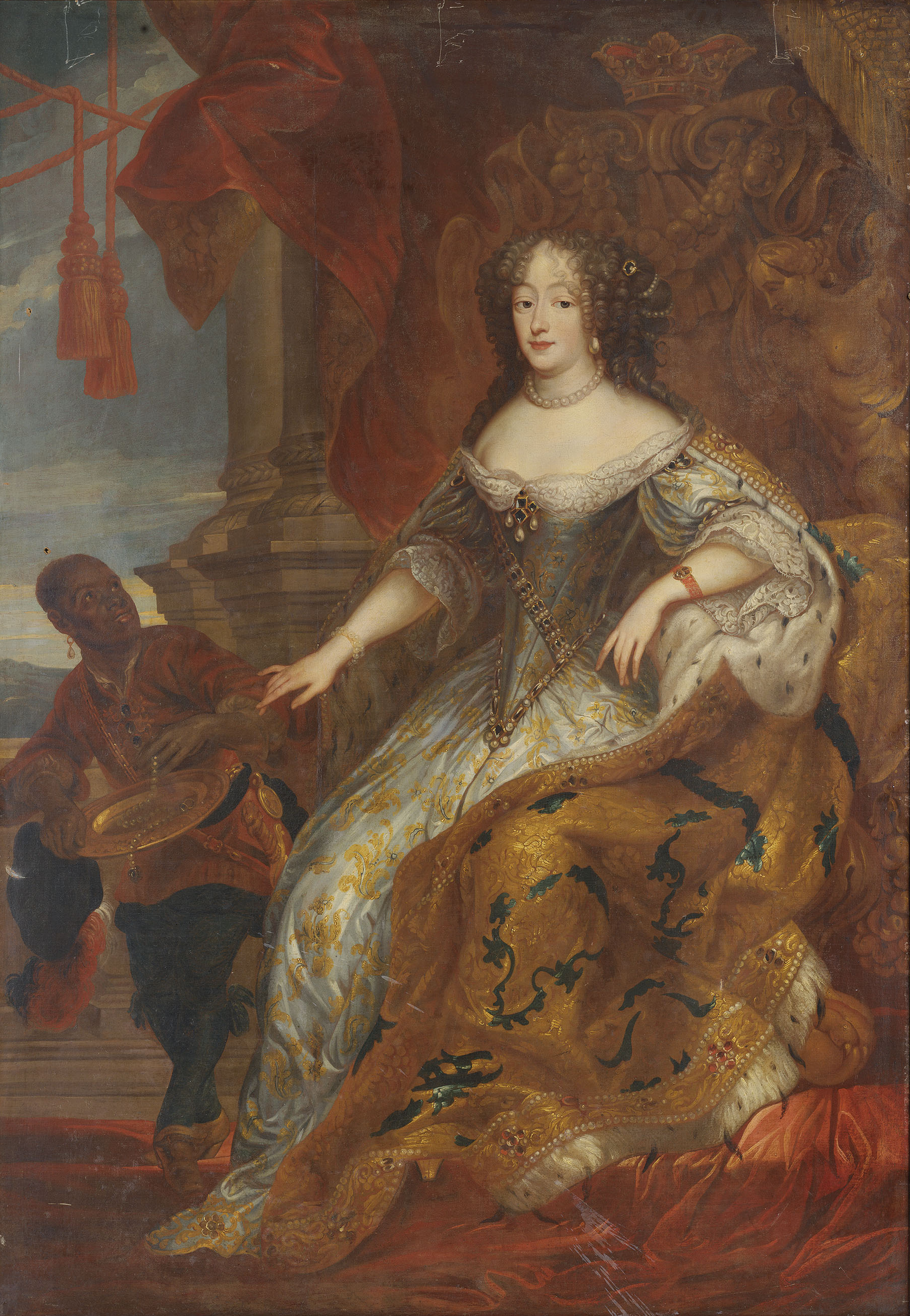
Portrait of Marie Jeanne Baptiste of Savoy-Nemours, oil on canvas, priv. col.

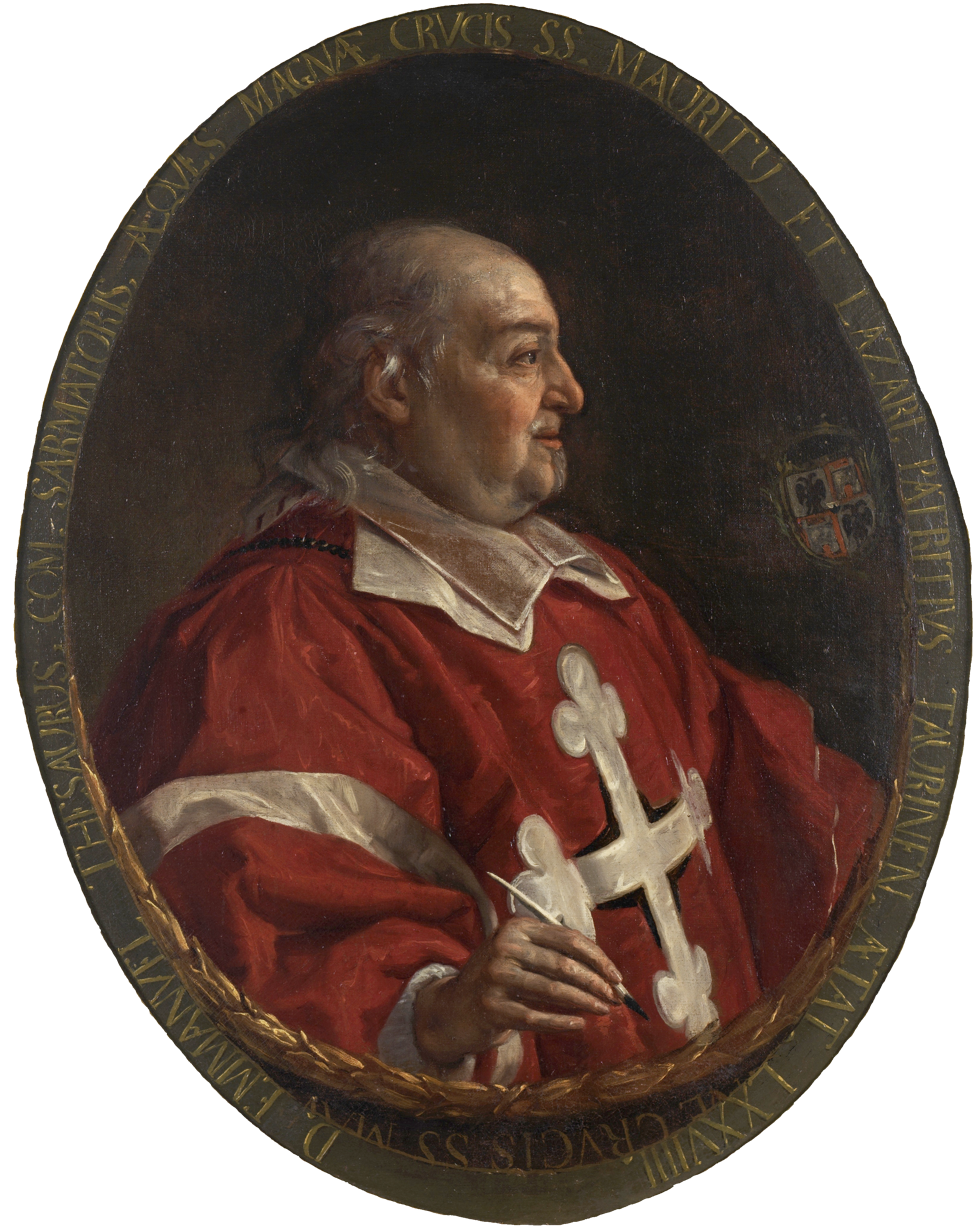
Portrait of Emanuele Tesauro, oil on canvas, priv. col.

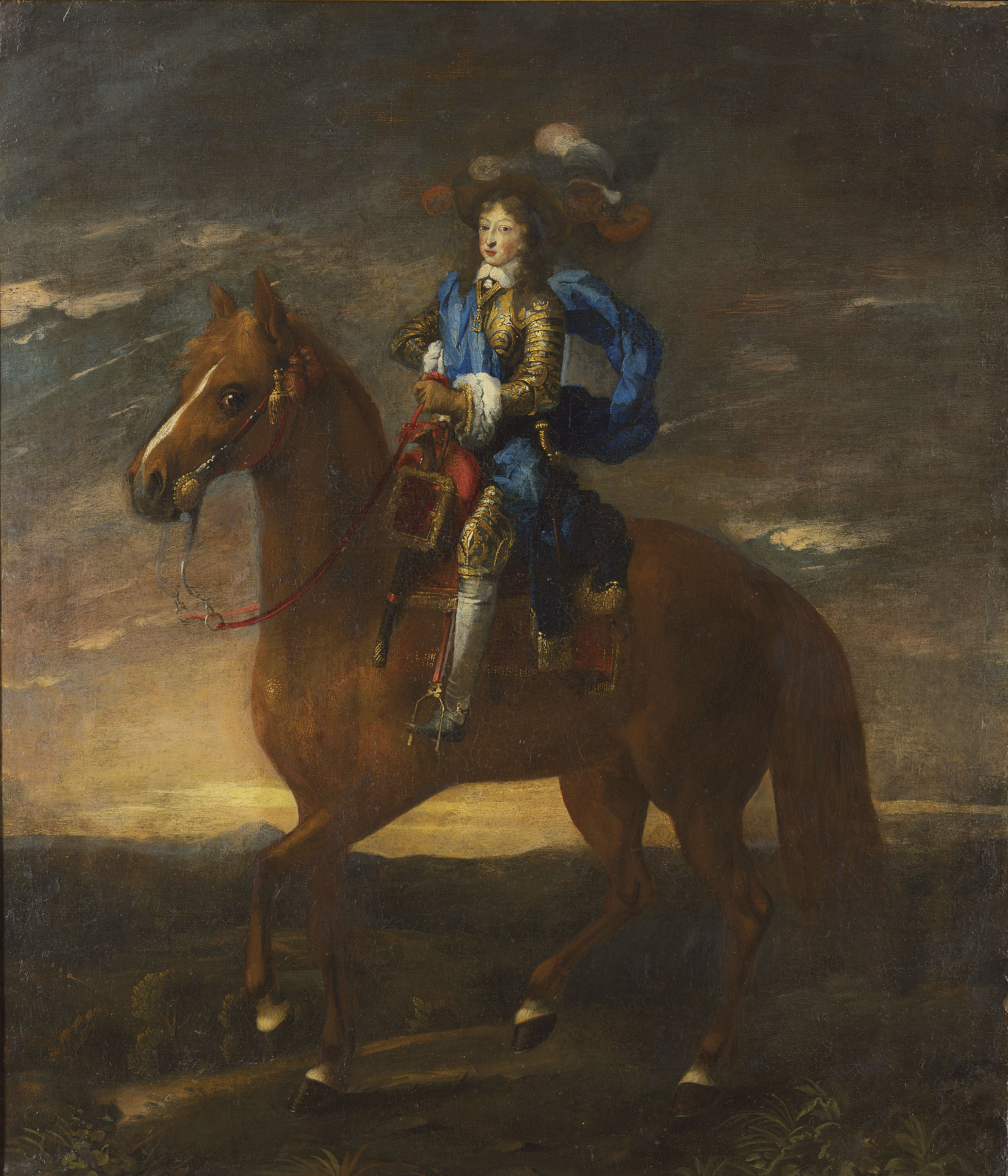
Equestrian portrait of Charles Emmanuel II of Savoy, oil on canvas, priv. col.

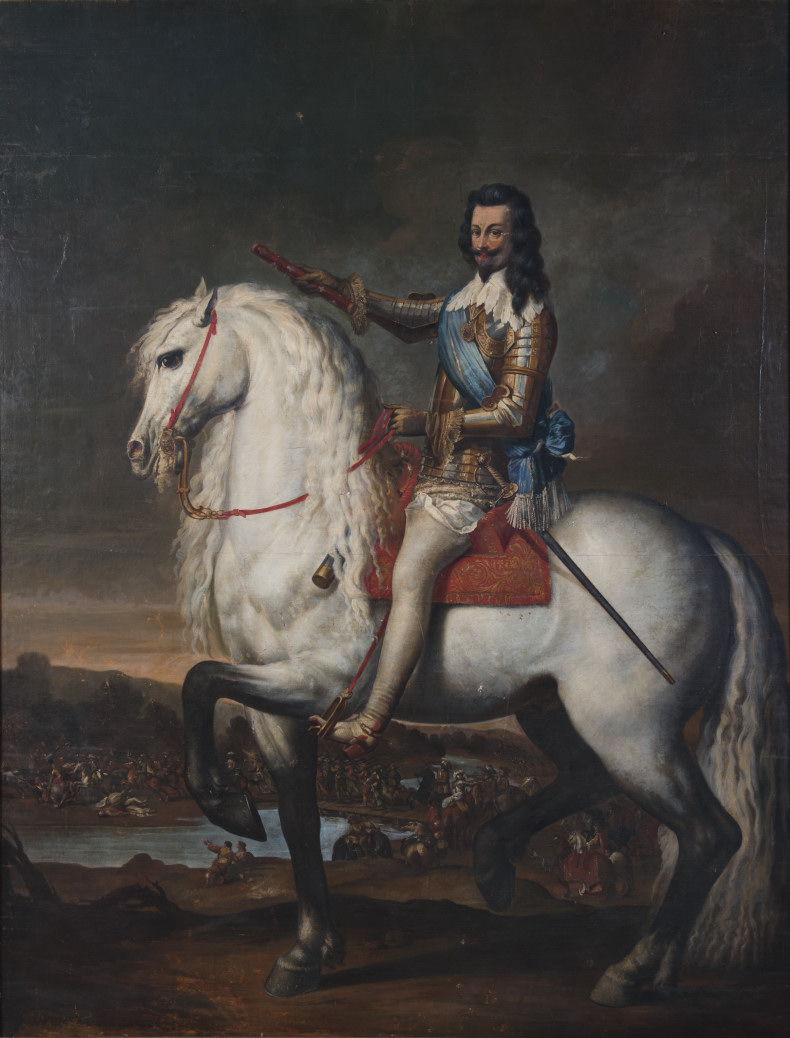
Equestrian portrait of Victor Amadeus I of Savoy, oil on canvas, Palace of Venaria

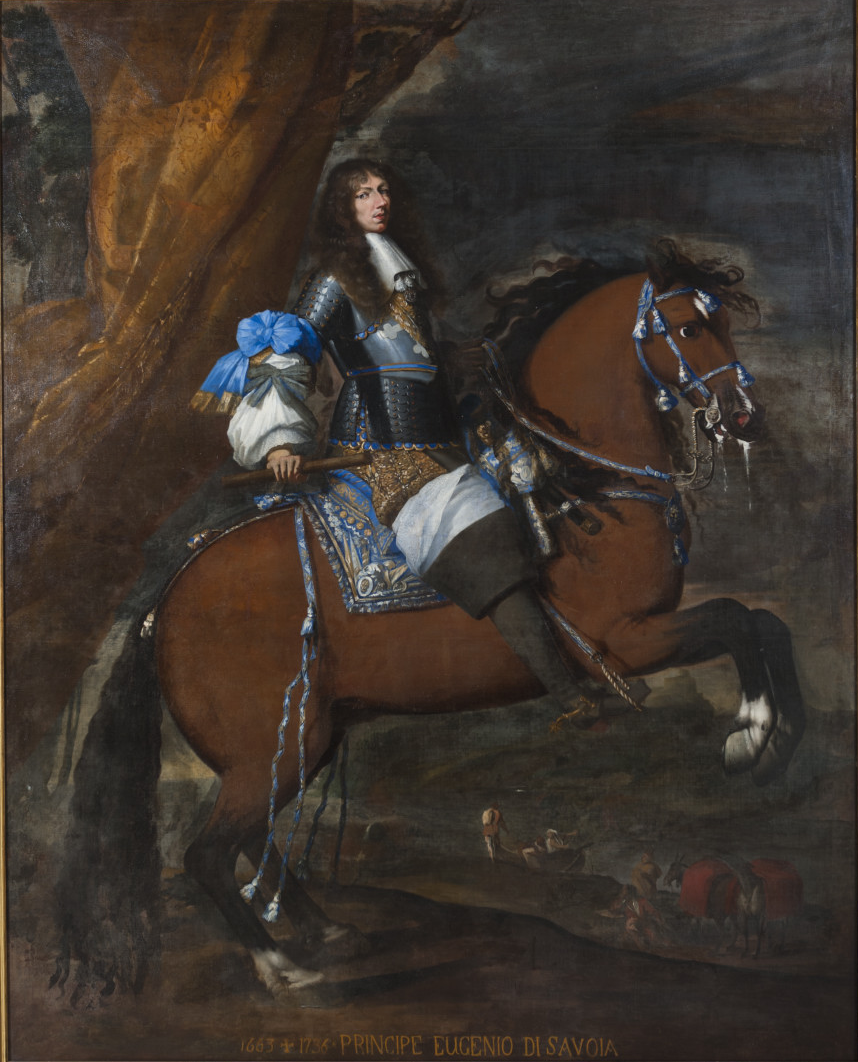
Equestrian portrait of Emmanuel Philibert of Carignano, oil on canvas, Palace of Venaria

== Bibliography ==
- Mallé, Luigi (1972). Figurative Art in Piedmont: From the seventeenth century to the nineteenth. Turin: RIV-SKF.
- Thuillier, Jacques (1987). "DAUPHIN, Charles". Dizionario Biografico degli Italiani (in Italian). Vol. 33: D'Asaro–De Foresta. Rome: Istituto dell'Enciclopedia Italiana. ISBN 978-88-12-00032-6.
