= GeoVax =

Biotechnology company

GeoVax is a clinical-stage biotechnology company which develops vaccines. GeoVax's development platform uses Modified Vaccinia Ankara (MVA) vector technology, with improvements to antigen design and manufacturing capabilities. GeoVax uses recombinant DNA or recombinant viruses to produce virus-like particles (VLPs) in the person being vaccinated.

== History ==
Formed in 2001 in Atlanta, Georgia, the approach was originally based on preclinical work done by Harriet Robinson from 1992 to 2002. In 2002, laboratory space, equipment and personnel were acquired and work on an HIV-1 vaccine development plan began. In May 2006, human clinical trials of the drug began. The company has previously worked on developing vaccines for Marburg, Lassa Fever, Ebola, Zika and COVID-19. Currently, the company is focused on developing their GEO-MVA platform for mpox and smallpox, with plans to initiate a Phase 3 immunobridging trial in the second half of 2026.

In January 2020, the company announced initiation of efforts to develop a vaccine against novel coronavirus disease (COVID-19) caused by the SARS-CoV-2 coronavirus. The GeoVax program has been added to the "Draft Landscape of COVID-19 Candidate Vaccines" by the World Health Organization.

On September 25, 2020, GeoVax closed an underwritten public offering, raising gross proceeds of $12.8 million. Concurrent with the offering, GeoVax common stock began trading on The Nasdaq Capital Market under the symbol "GOVX".

Recently, the company began collaborating with Emory University on the development of a therapeutic vaccine for human papillomavirus (HPV) infection, with a specific focus on head and neck cancer (HNC).

== Pre-clinical and clinical history ==
From preclinical results (using SHIV) 96% of primates (22/23) were protected from the virus over a three-and-a-half-year period when vaccinated, while by contrast five out of six primates died within eight months after being infected when left untreated. The vaccine works with a combined DNA vaccine and MVA (modified vaccinia Ankara) vaccine, both of which lead to the insertion of genes into primate DNA which leads to foreign protein expression. With the GeoVax vaccine, a variety of HIV proteins (both surface and internal) are expressed from genes which include the Env, Pol and Gag genes.

GeoVax is currently conducting multiple site Phase 2 Human clinical trials for HIV/AIDS preventive vaccine products following successful completion of multiple Phase 1 human clinical trials.

In 2010 GeoVax began enrolling patients in a Phase 1 therapeutic clinical trial for individuals already infected with HIV. The long-term therapeutic goal is to develop a vaccine-based mechanism to treat infected individuals that either prevents or significantly slows progression to symptomatic HIV, including AIDS, by stimulating an infected individual's immune system to resist the progression of infection. The study is being completed at the AIDS Research Consortium of Atlanta.

== Past trials ==
=== Therapeutic Vaccine Clinical Trials ===
During 2010, the AIDS Research Consortium of Atlanta (ARCA) began patient recruitment for a Phase 1 clinical trial sponsored by GeoVax Labs, Inc., investigating GeoVax's DNA/MVA vaccine as a treatment for individuals already infected with HIV. The trial is primarily designed as a safety study, but will also collect and report data on the vaccine's ability to elicit protective immune responses and control re-emergent virus during a pause in drug treatment. As part of the trial protocol, a volunteer must have begun drug treatment in the first year of infection and have achieved 6 months of stable viral control on drug treatment before entry into the trial and receipt of the first vaccination.

=== Preventive Vaccine Clinical Trials ===
GeoVax published results of Phase 1 safety and immunogenicity testing for its preventive vaccine trial on March 1, 2011. Based on published results, GeoVax will be advancing two regimens forward into the Phase 2a HVTN 205 trial. Regimens selected for advancement are the DDMM combination, which produced the highest T cell response rates, and the MMM combination. The MMM regimen produced the highest antibody-induced immune response.

The DDMM regimen consists of priming with two doses of the pGA2/JS7 recombinant DNA vaccine and boosting with two doses of VA/HIV62B recombinant MVA vaccine. The MMM regimen consists of priming and boosting with a total of three doses of the recombinant MVA vaccine.

HVTN 205 Study—In early 2009, the HVTN began enrolling patients in a preventive Phase 2 clinical trial sponsored by GeoVax Labs, Inc. This study is investigating a prime-boost approach using GeoVax's combination DNA/MVA vaccine. During 2010, the study was expanded from 225 to 300 participants to include an arm gathering additional data on three MVA injections, without the use of the DNA component, which is an addition to the original arm testing two DNA priming and two MVA boosting injections. Preliminary results were announced by the company on December 9, 2010. Preliminary results indicate an excellent safety profile and highly reproducible immunogenicity subsequently confirmed by the official publication above in The Journal of Infectious Diseases.

=== Phase 2a Clinical Trial Expansion ===
In April 2011, GeoVax Labs, Inc. in collaboration with the National Institute of Allergy and Infectious Diseases (NIAID), part of the U.S. National Institutes of Health (NIH) and the HIV Vaccine Trials Network (HVTN) announced an expansion of the current Phase 2a clinical trial to include a new component. The new trial is HVTN 094 and will be conducted by the HIV Vaccine Trials Network. "Specifically, the HVTN plans to clinically test a novel vaccine product developed by GeoVax scientists that expresses human granulocyte-macrophage colony stimulating factor (GM-CSF) in combination with inactivated HIV proteins. The novel vaccine consists of a recombinant DNA vaccine co-expressing human GM-CSF and non-infectious HIV virus-likeparticles. The DNA vaccine is used to prime immune responses that are subsequently boosted by vaccination with a recombinant modified vaccinia Ankara (MVA) vectored vaccine. The MVA expresses the HIV virus-like-particles, but does not express GM-CSF. The regimen builds on the GeoVax DNA/MVA vaccine that is currently in Phase 2a clinical testing through the HVTN."
