= Le Dauphin =

Le Dauphin was a French auto maker established in the 3rd arrondissement of Paris by André L. Dauphin. The company first presented a small two-seater cyclecar in the spring of 1941; production ended in 1942.

The car was an open-roof cyclecar with the seats positioned one behind the other. The body was built around a simple tube-based structure, probably inspired by recent developments in airplane construction; there was no separate chassis. The vehicles were produced on a production line at a small factory belonging to Kellner, a coachbuilder previously known for supplying bespoke bodies for chassis of France's luxury car makers. Dauphin versions were made with a petrol engine or an electric engine, with the motor for the petrol version being a two-stroke unit of 100 cc or 175 cc supplied by Zurcher. Petrol for civilian use was becoming unobtainable, and a 2 hp 48-volt electric power unit was substituted. The electric-powered cars were steered from the rear seat, whereas the petrol-engined ones were steered from the front.

== Sources and further reading ==
- G.N. Georgano: Autos. Encyclopédie complète. 1885 à nos jours. Courtille, 1975 (French)
