= Ronald Dauphin =

Ronald Dauphin is a Haitian grassroots activist, customs worker and political prisoner who has been imprisoned without trial since March 2004. A member of Fanmi Lavalas, he was arrested by armed rebels on March 1, 2004 - the day after the controversial Haitian President, Jean-Bertrand Aristide, fled into exile which was triggered by both a popular and an armed uprising. Mr. Dauphin has spent the ensuing years in a Haitian prison without having been convicted of any crime. Prior to his arrest, Ronald Dauphin A.K.A "Black" or Black Ronald, had been working several security and disposal jobs for the Lavalas party. He had also been the main security chief for the Mayor of Saint-Marc in the time prior to his government contract work. While incarcerated, his father was burned alive in his house by people seeking revenge on Ronald. He was also diagnosed with tuberculosis, due to the poor and overcrowded prison system in Haiti.

== Legal background ==
Ronald Dauphin is the last detainee held for the so-called La Scierie massacre, that Lavalas opponents claimed happened in the city of St. Marc, Haiti in February, 2004. Other La Scierie defendants were former Haitian Prime Minister Yvon Neptune and former Minister of the Interior Jocelerme Privert. No one has been convicted, or even tried in connection with the La Scierie incident. Most defendants have had their charges dismissed. Louis Joinet, the United Nations Commission on Human Right's Independent Expert on Haiti, concluded after investigation that there was no "massacre" at La Scierie, but instead a clash between two armed groups.

== International support for justice for Ronald Dauphin ==
On August 7, 2009 Amnesty International issued an Appeals Case for Dauphin. On June 10, 2009, U.S. Representative Maxine Waters wrote two letters, one to Haitian Prime Minister Michele Pierre-Louis, the other to U.S. Secretary of State Hillary Clinton, urging both to act to ensure justice for Ronald Dauphin. On December 2, 2008, 51 U.S.-based human rights organizations wrote to President René Préval asking for justice for Ronald Dauphin.

== Human rights organizations urge release of Haiti's political prisoners ==
In August 2006, Amnesty International called on Haiti's government to promptly bring to trial or release all political prisoners, condemning the prolonged detention of Lavalas activists as politically motivated. In October 2006, the National Lawyers Guild urged the Haitian government to release the remaining political prisoners, with particular emphasis on the defendants held in the La Scierie case. On December 14, 2008, the International Association of Democratic Lawyers(IADL) unanimously passed a Resolution calling for an end to Mr. Dauphin's persecution.

In May 2008, the Inter-American Court of Human Rights (IACHR) ruled that the State of Haiti had violated the human rights of former Prime Minister Yvon Neptune, another defendant in the La Scierie case, by holding him without trial for over two years with no proof he committed a crime. While Mr. Neptune was provisionally released, as was another defendant, Amanus Maette - Ronald Dauphin remains in prison.

== Prison situation in Haiti ==
The IACHR declared conditions in Haiti's overcrowded prisons inhumane. Numerous human rights reports document that prisoners are dying inside the sweltering, overcrowded 3800-person National Penitentiary in the country's capital, Port-au-Prince. They suffer dehydration and disease from filthy water, and Beri beri from starvation rations. Cell "blocks" built to hold five or six people are packed with up to 70 and 80 bodies at a time; prisoners take shifts sleeping and standing.
