= Central Dauphin =

Central Dauphin may refer to:

- Central Dauphin High School, Harrisburg, Dauphin County, Pennsylvania
- Central Dauphin School District, a public school district in central and eastern Dauphin County, Pennsylvania
