= Max Dauphin =

Luxembourgish painter (1977–2024)

The Diver

Max Dauphin (26 August 1977 – 6 September 2024) was a Luxembourgish painter. After years of international activity, the artist settled in Luxembourg where he worked and lived. He was part of the Bamhaus Art Collective. On several occasions, Dauphin participated in Luxembourg Art Week and Art 2 Cure.

== Career ==
Dauphin created figurative art works, using mixed techniques and big formats. His paintings frequently reveal scenes of life illustrated with slogans and/or iconography. His subjects are inspired by his experience, current events and more generally his entourage. Following daily conversations, the artist projects the viewer's attention toward captivating characters, sometimes living on the brink of society. By matching these characters with improbable attributes, their apparent realism gives way to the imagination. During his periples, Dauphin worked with a deliberate challenge: to use a local palette of available materials. The combination of colors and material highlights the playfulness of his characters and emphasizes the dynamism of his subjects.

Dauphin's first contact with art took place while drawing with his father, a graphic designer, at the kitchen table. During his studies in Marseille, France, Dauphin made contact with graffiti artists and dedicated himself to street art for a while. In parallel to his urban art-treks, he started showing his first paintings at the age of 25.

In 2005, Dauphin participated in a group exhibition with an art work entitled Dongo the Vulture illustrating West African poetry at the French cultural center in Rome. The same year, he also exhibited a series of portraits at the Luxembourg Embassy in Italy. In 2007, Dauphin opened a joint exhibition entitled Brush vs. Spray Can with graffiti artist Sumo at Konschthaus Beim Engel in Luxembourg.

Dauphin's first solo show, No Names, was shown in Kulturfoyer, Saarbrücken, Germany in 2008. The following year, the Francophone Games rewarded his painting Medusa's Raft with a special mention from the Jury.

While living in Central Asia, Dauphin exhibited City Spirits at the Tsagaandarium Gallery in Ulaanbaatar, Mongolia.

During his time in the United States (2011–2013), Dauphin came up with an American collection. Original Is Not Even a Flavor premiered at Rockaway Beach Surf Club and was later shown on Lower East Side at ConArtist Gallery.

From 2014 to 2015, Dauphin worked in Dakar, Senegal, where he showed Ana Wa Kër Gui?, an African series of paintings at Atelier Céramiques Almadies.

During his last years in Luxembourg, he was strongly involved in the local art community, collaborating with other artists and participating in many collective projects. His work was shown in Neimënster, at Luxembourg Art Week, Art to Cure, Reuter Bausch Gallery, Fellner Contemporary, Valerius Art Gallery, Krome Galerie, The Farm, Galerie Schlassgoart, Collective Hub 1535. He also continued his international activity with Chris Neuman in Brussels and The Mongolian Project in London.

== Death ==
Dauphin died in Seignosse, on 6 September 2024, at the age of 47.

== Solo exhibitions ==
- 2021 Travelogues, Fellner Contemporary, Luxembourg
- 2019 Inside Out. Stories from the collective unconscious, Neimënster, Luxembourg
- 2018 I Died (Un)Happy In My Sleep The Farm, Luxembourg, Luxembourg
- 2015 Ana Wa Kër Gui? Atelier Céramiques Almadies, Dakar, Senegal
- 2013 Original is not even a Flavor ConArtist Gallery and Rockaway Beach Surf Club, New York, NY, USA
- 2011 City Spirits Tsagaandarium Gallery, Ulaanbaatar, Mongolia
- 2008 No Names Kulturfoyer, Saarbrücken, Germany
- 2005 Portraits Ambassade du Luxembourg, Rome, Italy

== Group exhibitions ==
- 2023 Art 2 Cure, Konschthal Esch
- 2023 Duo Show Reuter Bausch Art Gallery, Luxembourg
- 2022 Luxembourg Art Week
- 2021 New Borders, Exposition de Max Dauphin & Chris Neuman à l'espace Degand, Bruxelles
- 2021 Art 2 Cure, BIL, Luxembourg
- 2018 "Fëschmaart" Valerius Art Gallery, Luxembourg
- 2018 "Octopus", Siren's Call, Centre culturel de rencontre Abbaye de Neumünster, Luxembourg
- 2017 "Oh No", Luxembourg Art Week, Luxembourg
- 2017 "Mermaid", Siren's Call, Centre culturel de rencontre Abbaye de Neumünster, Luxembourg
- 2016 "Mixed Media Xmas" Krome Gallery, Luxembourg
- 2016 "Nineveh" Luxembourg Art Week, Luxembourg
- 2016 "Transformation" Krome Gallery, Luxembourg
- 2015 "The Mongolia Project" Art Hub Gallery, London, UK
- 2009 Radeau de la Méduse Beirut, Lebanon
- 2009 Brush vs Spray Can Konschthaus Beim Engel, Luxembourg
- 2005 Dongo le Vautour Centre Culturel Français, Rome, Italy

== Awards ==
- 2009 Jeux de la Francophonie (Beirut, Lebanon) : Mention spéciale du Jury pour le Radeau de la Méduse
