= Kerstin Krieglstein =

German neuroscientist

Rector of University of Freiburg
- Incumbent
- Assumed office 2020

Rector of University of Konstanz
- In office 2018–2020

Personal details
- Born: 23 July 1963 (age 62) Erlangen, Germany
- Occupation: Neuroscientist

Kerstin Krieglstein is a German neuroscientist. She has been the head of the University of Freiburg since 2020, after serving in the same position at the University of Konstanz from 2018 to 2020.

== Personal life ==
Kerstin Krieglstein was born in Erlangen, Germany. She is married to Klaus Unsicker, who is also a German neuroscientist. Together they have two children, Christine Unsicker and Sebastian Unsicker.

== Research ==
In the beginning of her career, during her PhD and her first postdoctoral project, her research mainly focused on the structure of the tetanus toxin and that of the botulinum neurotoxin type A. Later on, she worked on the TGF-β signaling pathway. After this, her research interests focused around molecular neurobiology, starting with neuronal survival and ontogenetic cell death. She continued in this general direction by concentrating the role of cell-extrinsic signals in nervous system development: induction and specification of neuronal phenotypes and synaptogenesis.

== Academic leadership ==
Krieglstein is the head (German: Rektorin) of the University of Konstanz since 2018. She is only the third woman to occupy the position of university rector in Baden-Württemberg. From 2014 until 2018 she was the dean of the Faculty of Medicine in Freiburg, Germany.
