= Marc Dauphin =

Canadian retired military surgeon

- Born: 6 February 1960 (age 65); Montreal, Quebec, Canada
- Education: Le Petit Séminaire de Québec

Major Marc Dauphin, MSM, CD (born 6 February 1960) is a Canadian retired military doctor specialized in emergency medicine. He was based in Kandahar, Afghanistan, where he was in charge of the Role 3 Multinational Hospital at Kandahar Airfield. Major Dauphin was the basis for the character of Colonel Xavier Marks in the Canadian TV series Combat Hospital.

== Life and career ==
Dauphin was born in Montreal and attended high school at Le Petit Séminaire de Québec (now Le Collège François de Laval), then studied medicine at Université Laval in Quebec City.

As a result of the trauma of serving in a war zone, he suffered from post-traumatic stress disorder and contemplated suicide.

Dauphin wrote Combat Doctor about his experiences in Afghanistan.
