= Treaty of Worms (1743) =

Alliance between Great Britain, Austria, and Sardinia

The Treaty of Worms was a political alliance formed between Great Britain, Austria and the Kingdom of Sardinia, signed on 13 September 1743, during the War of the Austrian Succession.

It was an ambitious piece of foreign policy on the part of the British government which sought to split the Emperor Charles VII, prince-elector of Bavaria, from French influence, whilst simultaneously resolving the differences between the Emperor, Queen Maria Theresa of Hungary and King Charles Emmanuel III of Sardinia.

== Contents of the treaty ==
Under the terms of the treaty, Maria Theresa agreed to transfer to the King of Sardinia the city and part of the Duchy of Piacenza, the Vigevanesco, part of the Duchy of Pavia, part of the county of Anghiera which lay to the west of Lake Maggiore, and claims to the Marquisate of Finale. She also engaged to maintain 30,000 men in Italy, to be commanded by Savoy-Sardinia.

Great Britain agreed to pay the sum of £300,000 for the ceding of Finale, and to furnish an annual subsidy of £200,000, on the condition that Savoy-Sardinia should employ 45,000 men. In addition to this fiscal arrangement, Britain agreed to send a fleet into the Mediterranean.

Under a separate, secret convention, agreed contemporaneously with the Treaty, but which was neither formally ratified nor publicly acknowledged, it was stipulated that Britain would pay Maria Theresa an annual subsidy of £300,000, for as long "as the necessity of her affairs should require."

The terms of the Treaty of Worms relative to the ceding of the marquisate of Finale to Savoy-Sardinia were particularly unjust to the Genoese, since the territory had been guaranteed to them by the fourth article of the Quadruple Alliance of 2 August 1718 between Britain, France, Austria, and the Netherlands.

== Criticism ==
The Treaty of Worms was presented to the Commons on 9 January 1744, and was considered in the entire house on 1 February 1744.

=== William Pitt ===
William Pitt, 1st Earl of Chatham, speaking in the House of Commons on 1 December 1743 roundly condemned the Treaty in the following statement which occurred during the course of an address of thanks he was giving after the Battle of Dettingen:

I had almost forgotten, sir (I wish future nations may forget), to mention the Treaty of Worms.

I wish that treaty could be erased from our annals and our records, so as never to be mentioned hereafter: for that treaty, with its appendix, the convention that followed, is one of the most destructive, unjust, and absurd that was ever concluded. By that treaty we have taken upon ourselves a burden which I think it impossible for us to support; we have engaged in such an act of injustice toward Genoa as must alarm all Europe, and give to the French a most signal advantage. From this, sir, all the princes of Europe will see what regard we have to justice when we think that the power is on our side; most of them, therefore, will probably join with France in curtailing our power, or, at least, in preventing its increase.

The alliance of Sardinia and its assistance may, I admit, be of great use to us in defeating the design of the Spaniards in Italy. But gold itself may be bought too dear; and I fear we shall find the purchase we have made to be but precarious, especially if Sardinia should be attacked by France as well as by Spain, the almost certain consequence of our present scheme of politics. For these reasons, sir, I hope there is not any gentleman, nor even any minister, who expects that I should declare my satisfaction that this treaty has been concluded.

=== Thomas Carlyle ===
Thomas Carlyle had this to say on the terms of the treaty:

And so there is a Treaty of Worms got concocted, after infinite effort on the part of Carteret, Robinson too laboring and steaming in Vienna with boilers like to burst; and George gets it signed 13th September [already signed while Friedrich was looking into Seckendorf and Wembdingen, if Friedrich had known it]: to this effect, That Charles Emanuel should have annually, down on the nail, a handsome increase of Subsidy (200,000 pounds instead of 150,000 pounds) from England, and ultimately beyond doubt some thinnish specified slices from the Lombard parts; and shall proceed fighting for, not against; English Fleet co-operating, English Purse ditto, regardless of expense; with other fit particulars, as formerly.

== See also ==
- List of treaties
