= Future Vision Technologies =

Companies based in Champaign County, Illinois

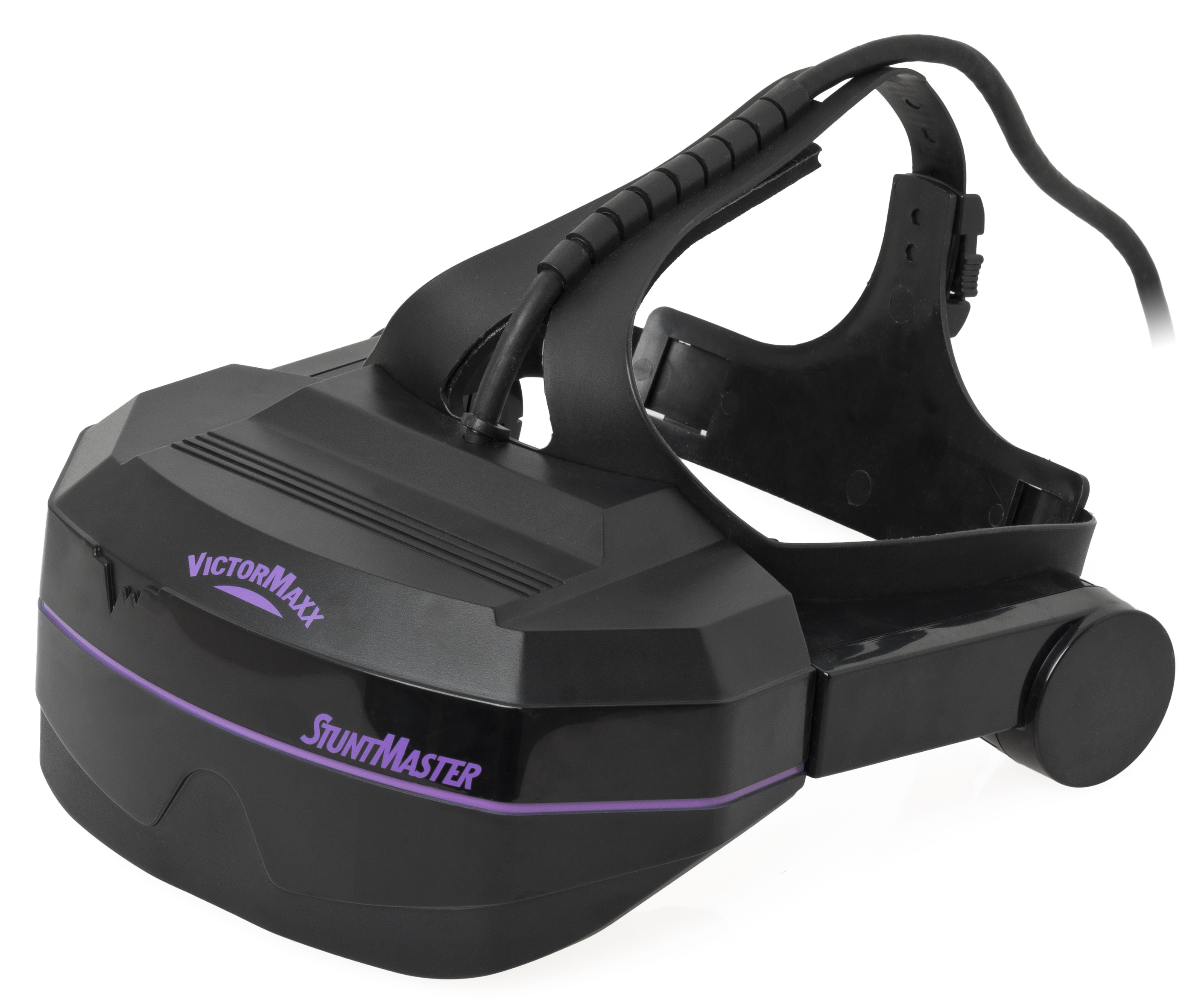
The VictorMaxx Stuntmaster headset

Future Vision Technologies (FVT), operating from 1991 to 1995, was part of the second wave of companies working to commercialize virtual reality technology. The company was founded by a team out of the Advanced Digital Systems Laboratory in the department of Electrical and Computer Engineering at the University of Illinois at Urbana-Champaign. The three original members, Matt Klapman, David Frerichs, and Kevin Lee, were later joined by John Belmonte. The company ceased to be an active entity when its PC card business was sold to Fujitsu Microelectronics.

== Products ==
The company produced a number of products which appear to be first of their kind in the market.

- Stuntmaster Head Mounted Display (HMD) - the first consumer virtual reality headset to ship in the market The low-resolution, monocular device shipped with a patented mechanical head tracker which had fast response times and accurate positioning. The product itself was marketed and sold under license by VictorMaxx.
- Sapphire IME with Pixel Bus - an integrated 3D graphics card with graphics and audio output. A major innovation, demonstrated at AES 94 in Washington, DC and at SIGGRAPH 94 in Orlando, FL, USA, was the ability to chain multiple cards together across multiple Pentium-class personal computers to create a single simulation environment known as a VR CAVE. The Siggraph 94 demonstration consisted of three Sapphire IME cards installed in three Pentium (90 MHz) computers driving three synchronized Barco projectors. Each screen was running frame-interlaced stereo, allowing users wearing LCD shutter glasses to be fully immersed in the scene. Until this demonstration, VR CAVE implementations had only been implemented using high-end graphics workstations from companies like Silicon Graphics.
- InterFACE Portable Virtual Environment Generator

== Contemporary virtual reality companies ==
- Autodesk (Cyberspace Developer Kit Group)
