= San Francesco da Paola, Turin =

Church of San Francesco da Paola
- Chiesa di San Francesco da Paola
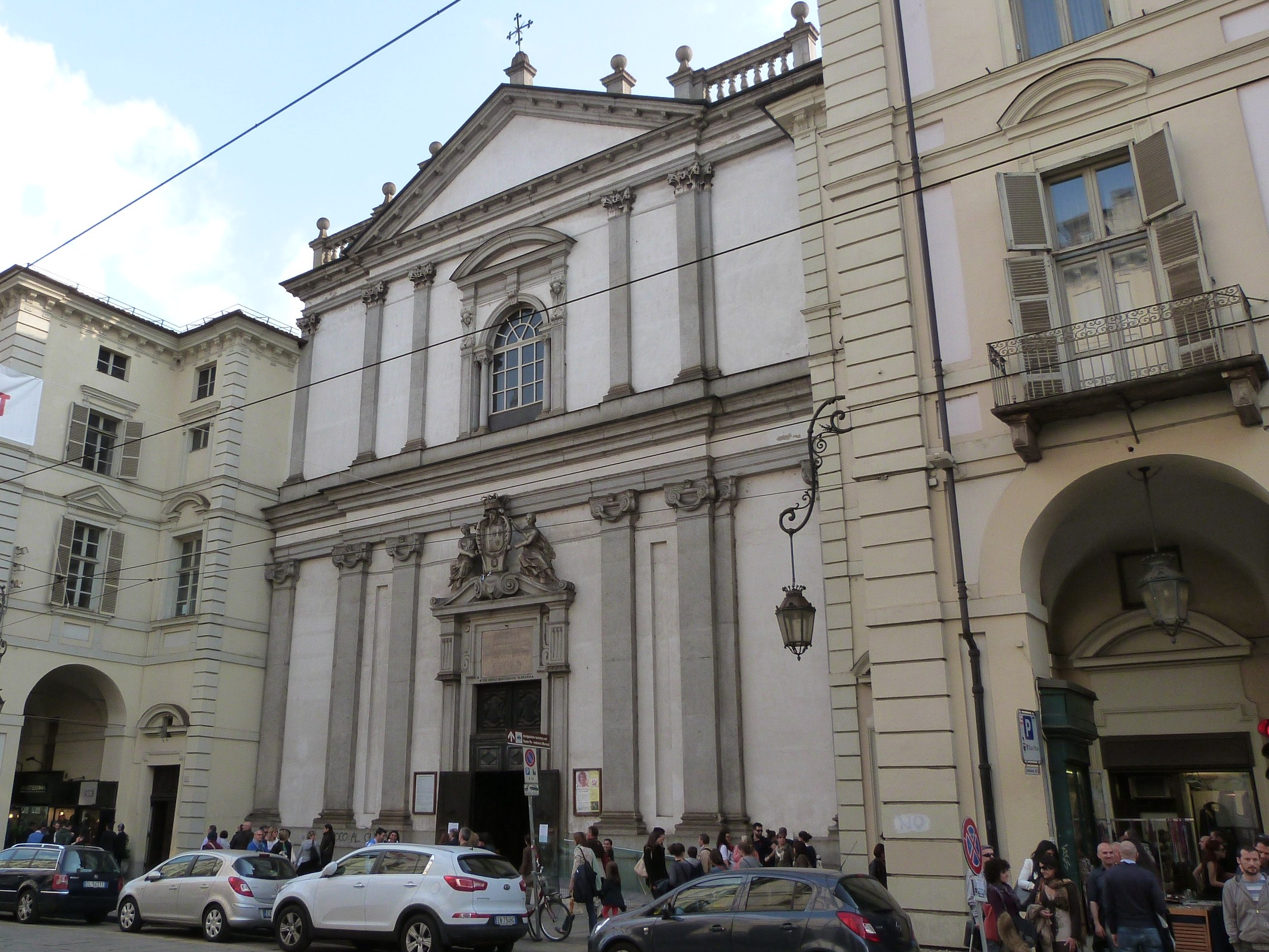
- Façade of the church

- Map of Turin
- 45.0684°N 7.6892°E
- Country: Italy
- Denomination: Roman Catholic Church

Architecture
- Style: Baroque
- Groundbreaking: 1632
- Completed: 1667

Administration
- Archdiocese: Turin

San Francesco da Paola is a Baroque style, Roman Catholic church located on Via di Po in Turin, region of Piedmont, Italy.

== History ==
Construction of a church began in 1634 using designs of Pellegrino Pellegrini with the patronage of Christine Marie of France, Duchess of Savoy. It was built adjacent to a convent for monks of the Franciscan order. The church was frescoed both on the interior and exterior of the facade by Francesco Guatier of Saluzzo. The main altarpiece was painted by Tommaso Lorenzoni. In the Chapel of the Holy Trinity, there is a canvas by Sebastiano Taricco. The paintings of six apostles found in the choir, were painted by Bartolomeo Guidoboni. In the last century, the convent was converted into a school.
