= Rhine campaign =

Rhine campaign may refer to:

- Rhine campaign of 1713 during the War of the Spanish Succession
- Rhine Campaign of 1748 during the War of the Austrian Succession
- Rhine campaign of 1792 during the War of the First Coalition, see Campaigns of 1792 in the French Revolutionary Wars#Rhine front (July – 20 September 1792, also known as the "Valmy campaign") and Campaigns of 1792 in the French Revolutionary Wars#Rhineland campaign (21 September – 31 October 1792)
- Rhine campaigns of 1793–94 during the War of the First Coalition
- Rhine campaign of 1795 during the War of the First Coalition
- Rhine campaign of 1796 during the War of the First Coalition

== See also ==
- Roman campaigns in Germania (12 BC – AD 16)
- Army of the Rhine (1791–1795)
- Army of the Rhine (disambiguation)
- Allied advance from Paris to the Rhine or the Siegfried Line campaign (August 1944 - March 1945) during World War II
