= Nikolai Vasilyevich Repnin =

Russian statesman and general (1734–1801)

Prince Nikolai Vasilyevich Repnin
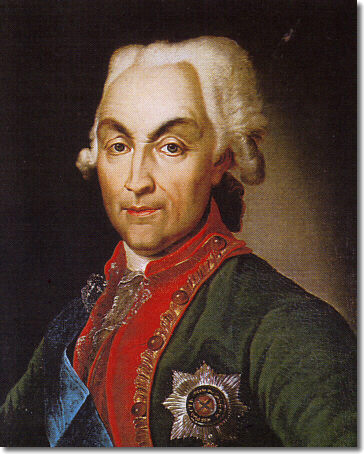
- Born: 22 March 1734; St. Petersburg, Russian Empire
- Died: 24 May 1801 (aged 67) village of Vorontsovo, Moscow district, Moscow Province
- Burial place: Donskoy Monastery
- Relatives: House of Repnin
- Military career
- Allegiance: Russia
- Branch: Imperial Russian Army
- Service years: 1749–1798
- Rank: Field Marshal
- Conflicts: War of the Austrian Succession; Seven Years' War; Russo-Turkish War (1768–1774); Battle of Vocarești; War of the Bavarian Succession; Russo-Turkish War (1787–1792); Battle of Salcia Mică; Siege of Izmail (1789); Battle of Măcin
- Awards: Order of St. Anne; Order of St. Andrew; Order of St. George; Order of St. Vladimir; Order of the White Eagle

Prince Nikolai or Nicholas (Note: Anglicized form of the name) Vasilyevich Repnin (Russian: Николай Васильевич Репнин; 22 March [O.S. 11 March] 1734 – 24 May [O.S. 12 May] 1801) was a Russian statesman and general from the Repnin princely family who played a key role in the dissolution of the Polish–Lithuanian Commonwealth; the leading figure in the Repnin Sejm, the victor at Măcin.

== Early life and education ==
Born in Saint Petersburg, his parents were Prince Vasily Anikitovich Repnin and Daria Fedorovna Makarova. He was the grandson of Anikita Ivanovitch Repnin, who served during the reign of Emperor Peter I the Great.

14-year-old Prince Repnin served in the Imperial Russian Army under his father, during the Rhine Campaign of 1748, and subsequently resided for some time abroad, in Germany where he acquired "a thoroughly sound German education" and also in Paris. He also participated, in a subordinate capacity, in the Seven Years' War serving under Field Marshal Stepan Fyodorovich Apraksin. He distinguished himself in the battles of Groß-Jägersdorf, Königsberg and the siege of Küstrin. From 1759, he served in allied France, in the troops of Marshal Louis Georges Érasme de Contades and from 1760, having received the rank of colonel, he served under Count Zakhar Chernyshev, taking part, in particular, in the capture of Berlin that same year. In 1762, he received the rank of major general, and on September 22, 1762, he was awarded the Holstein Order of St. Anne.

== Rule of Poland ==
In 1762, Emperor Peter III sent him to Prussia as ambassador in Berlin where Repnin remained until 1763 and thoroughly studied military affairs, also becoming familiar with the orders and organization of King Frederick II's army.

In 1763, the new Empress Catherine II transferred him to Poland as minister plenipotentiary in Warsaw. He had an affair, at the request of the king Stanisław II August Poniatovski and the husband, Prince Adam Kazimierz Czartoryski, with Princess Izabela Czartoryska, in hope to curry favor with the envoy and was rumored to have fathered her first born son Adam Jerzy Czartoryski in 1769.

Catherine II appointed him director of the Land Noble Corps, and a few months later sent him to Poland, where he was to assist the Russian envoy, Count Hermann Carl von Keyserling, in seeking equal rights with Catholics for so-called dissidents (Orthodox and Protestants). After Keyserling's death in 1764, Repnin became minister plenipotentiary and began actively intervening in the country's internal affairs and promoting the elevation of Stanisław Poniatowski to the vacant Polish throne following the death of king Augustus III, a position that completely satisfied the Saint Petersburg court.

Due to the level of Russian control of the Polish government, Repnin was the effective ruler of the country, with special instructions to form a pro-Russian faction from among the various Protestants, who were to receive equal rights with the Catholics. Repnin believed that the Protestants were not significant enough to benefit Russia; at the same time, the Protestant community itself petitioned Empress Catherine, requesting not to be involved.

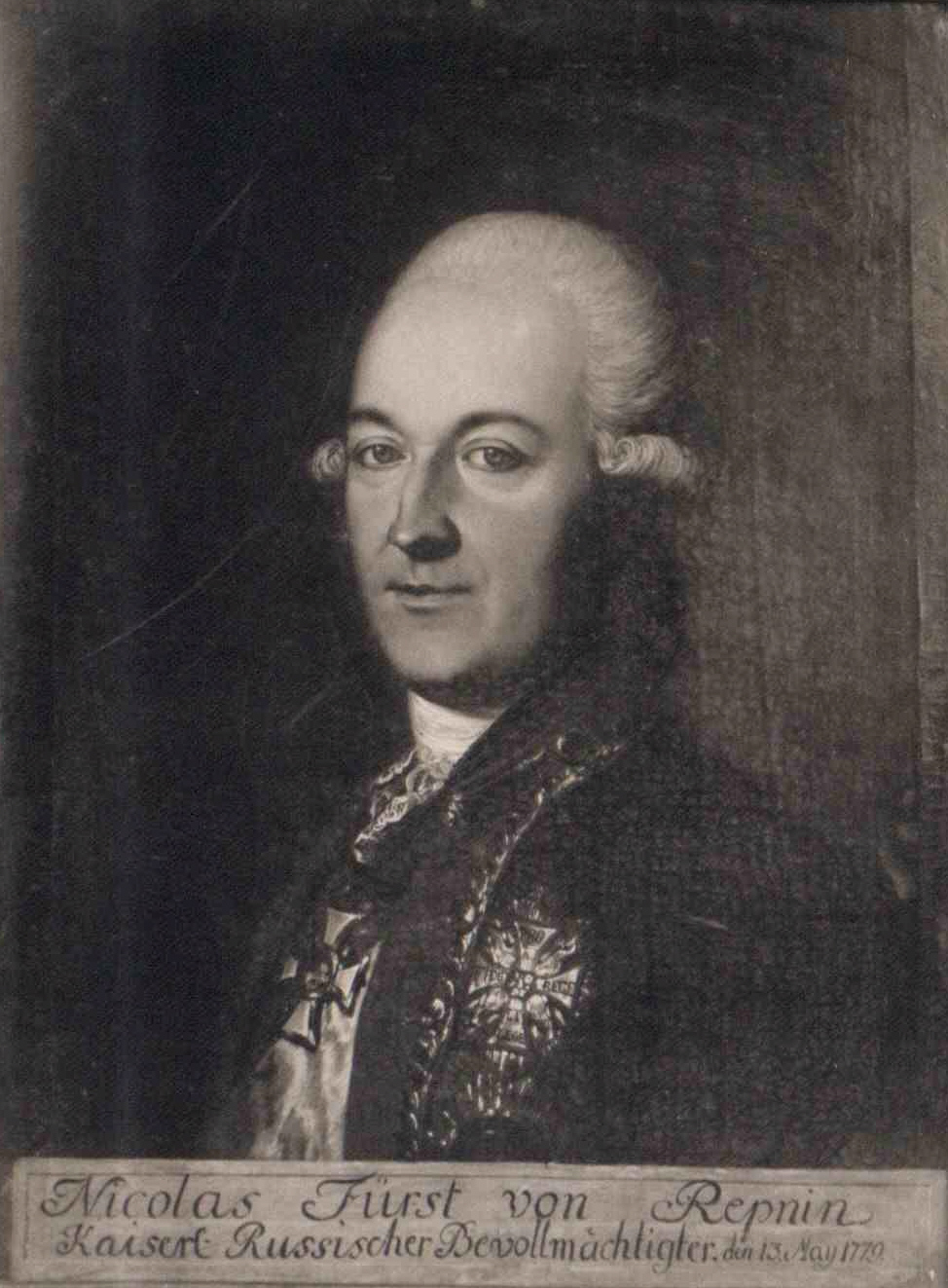
Prince Nicolas von Repnin 1779

Repnin convinced himself that the dissidents were too poor and insignificant to be of any real support to Russia, and that the whole agitation in their favour was factitious. At last, indeed, the dissidents themselves even petitioned the empress to leave them alone. It is clear from his correspondence that Repnin, a singularly proud and high-spirited man, much disliked the very dirty work he was called upon to do. Nevertheless, he faithfully obeyed his instructions, and, by means more or less violent or discreditable, forced the Sejm of 1768 to concede everything.

In order to further Russian interests, he encouraged the creation of two Protestant confederations of Sluck and Toruń and later, a Catholic one the Radom Confederation, in June 1767. When the confederation seized Warsaw and summoned a Sejm in 1768, Repnin with the aid of Russian troops compelled the Sejm to accept the principle of Russia's right to intervene in Polish internal affairs.

According to the Encyclopædia Britannica Eleventh Edition, Repnin's correspondence reveals that he disliked the type of politics he was required to engage in. Nevertheless, he obeyed his instructions, and used various means to force the 1767–1768 Sejm (the "Repnin Sejm") to concede all points in dispute. Before the Sejm, he ordered the capture and exile to Kaluga of some vocal opponents of his policies – Józef Andrzej Załuski and Wacław Rzewuski. The immediate result was the formation of the Bar Confederation, which practically demolished the ambassador's strategy.

The Ottoman Empire declared war on Russia. Repnin was removed from his Warsaw post and sent to fight the Osmans. During the Russo-Turkish War of 1768–1774, Repnin returned to Russia after its outbreak. On 10 April 1769, Empress Catherine II dismissed Nikolai Repnin from his post. In April 1769, when the political situation changed somewhat, Repnin was replaced in Poland by Prince Mikhail Nikitich Volkonsky.

For his diplomatic services during his service in Poland, Repnin was awarded the Order of St. Alexander Nevsky on January 17, 1768, conferred the rank of lieutenant general and granted 50,000 rubles. However, according to French diplomat, Baron Marie Daniel Bourrée de Corberon (1748–1810), not everyone at the Saint Petersburg court was impressed by the results of his mission to Warsaw:

"Possessing a rather lively but superficial mind, he pleases women, but is also completely subservient to them; pleasure is the sole motive for all his actions. Everyone here is dissatisfied with his work in Poland, as he has only muddled matters to Russia's disadvantage. He was in love with the wife of Adam Czartoryski, the Russians' most feared enemy. Submitting to this woman, he is said to have paid her for a night of patronage for the Bar Confederation, contrary to the interests of his court. This grave mistake left such a bad impression here that the question arose of whether Repnin should be recalled under the pretext that he had gone mad."

== Military career ==
Nikolai Repnin resigned his post as Russian envoy to lead troops against the Ottoman Empire in the Russo-Turkish War. Having settled his urgent affairs in Warsaw, Repnin left Poland, where he had been the de facto "king" for six years, and joined Prince Alexander Mikhailovich Golitsyn's forces, then stationed near Khotyn. The siege dragged on sluggishly. Participating in repelling repeated Turkish attempts to cross the Dniester throughout August, which limited his combat activities, Repnin languished in inaction, a state especially acute after the turbulent Polish life of recent years. On 9 September 1769, Khotyn was cleared by the Turks.

At the head of an independent command in Moldavia and Wallachia, he prevented a large Ottoman army from crossing the River Prut in 1770, distinguished himself at the actions of battle of Larga and Kagul, and captured Izmail and Kiliia.

A quarrel with the commander-in-chief, Count Pyotr Rumyantsev, who blamed him for the Turkish occupation of the fortress of Giurji, abandoned by the Russians. Insulted, Repnin requested leave from the army to go abroad, allegedly under the pretext of "poor health" in 1771. Between 1771 and 1774 he was on sick leave and resting. October 1, 1771 Repnin left for Germany. In the summer of 1772, he enjoyed the spas at Spa. In the autumn of 1772, Princess Izabela Czartoryska was in London, where Repnin traveled with her. For almost the entire year, Repnin was faced with the difficult task of organizing his financial affairs, which had by this time fallen into such disarray that a large loan seemed the only way to avoid complete ruin. Repnin planned to secure this loan in Holland, from the renowned banker Gop, for 120,000 rubles, with a 20-year repayment period. Count, Minister of foreign affairs, Nikita Panin was also brought in to assist with the arrangements. Repnin personally traveled to The Hague on this matter.

In 1774 he participated in the capture of Silistria and in the negotiations which led to the treaty of Küçük Kaynarca. In 1775–1776 Repnin and his factotum, Yakov Bulgakov, represented Russian interests at the Porte. On the outbreak of the War of the Bavarian Succession he led 30,000 men to Breslau, and at the subsequent congress of Teschen, where he was Russian plenipotentiary, compelled Austria to make peace with Prussia.

During the Russo-Turkish War (1787–1792) Repnin was, after Alexander Suvorov, the most successful of the Russian commanders. He defeated the Ottomans at Salcia, captured the whole camp of the seraskier, Cenaze Hasan Pasha, shut him up in Izmail, and was preparing to reduce the place when he was forbidden to do so because of his indecisiveness at the siege in 1789. After another unsuccessful siege by Pavel Potemkin, Samoylov, and de Ribas, Suvorov, appointed by Grigori Alexandrovich Potemkin, stormed Izmail. He was ambassador to the Ottoman Empire (1775–1776).

On the retirement of Potemkin in 1791, Repnin succeeded him as commander-in-chief, and immediately won the Battle of Măcin. The Ottomans signed the truce of Galaţi on 31 July (O.S. 11 August) 1791.

== Declining years ==
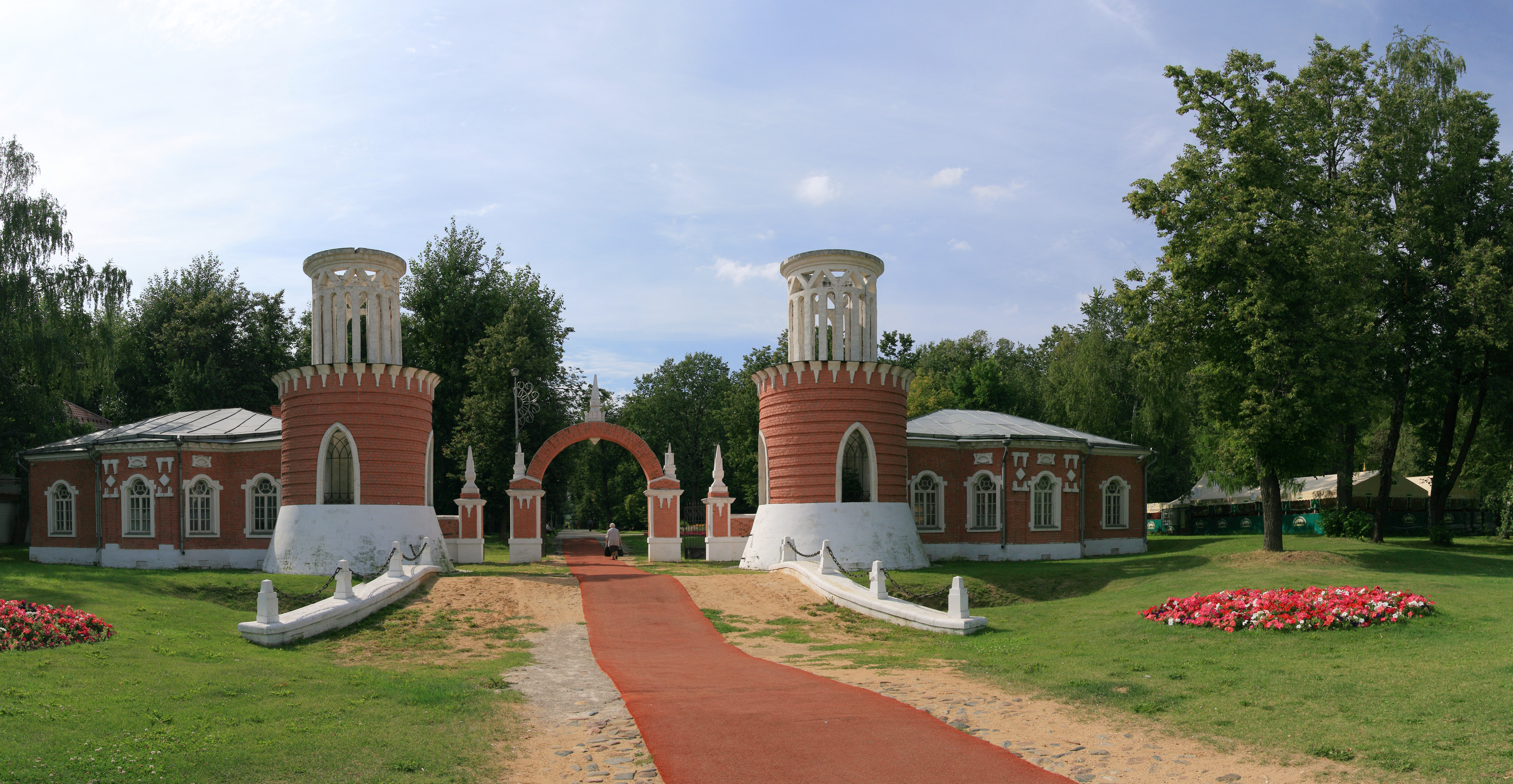
The gates leading to Repnin's country residence Vorontsovo near Moscow.

After the Second Partition of Poland, Repnin was made governor-general of the newly acquired Lithuanian provinces, where he also commanded the Russian forces during the Kościuszko Uprising. Emperor Paul I raised him to the rank of field marshal in 1796, and in 1798 sent him on a diplomatic mission to Berlin and Vienna to detach Prussia from France and unite the Habsburg monarchy and Prussia against the French First Republic. Unsuccessful, upon his return to Saint Petersburg, Emperor Paul I dismissed him on November 30, 1798, from active service with the right to wear the general army uniform.

He died of a stroke at the age of 67 on 24 May 1801 in the village of Vorontsovo, Moscow district, Moscow Province.

A major landowner and soul (serf) owner, in 1794 he owned 4,500 male peasants and was the founder of the Vorontsovo estate near Moscow. He was awarded the Order of St. Alexander Nevsky (1768), the Order of St. Andrew the First-Called (1780; diamond insignia were added to it in 1784), and the Order of St. Vladimir, 1st Class (1782), among others.

== Issue ==
Nikolai Repnin had two illegitimate sons, poet Ivan Pnin and military commander, governor and senator Stepan Ivanovich Lesovsky (1781 or 1782–1839) from his relationship with Anastasia Nikolaevna Neledinskaya-Meletskaya, née Golovina (1754–1803). It was widely rumored that Prince Adam Jerzy Czartoryski (born January 1770) was the fruit of a liaison between Repnin and the married Princess Izabela Czartoryska.

Repnin's legitimate children from his marriage in 1754 with Princess Natalya Aleksandrovna Kurakina (1737–1798) were three daughters Praskovya (1756–1784), Alexandra (1757–1834), Daria (1769–1812) and a boy Ivan, who died in 1774 at the age of nine, from dropsy. Alexandra was married to Prince Grigory Semyonovich Volkonsky, Praskovya to Prince Fyodor Nikolaevich Golitsyn, and Daria (later) to Baron Kalenberg. He outlived his wife by three years, who died on November 22, 1798, in Vilnius.

Upon his death, as the male Repnin line became extinct, Emperor Alexander I permitted in July 1801 Repnin's grandson prince Nikolai Repnin-Volkonsky to assume the Repnin name and his grandfather's coat-of-arms.

== See also ==
- Ambassadors and envoys from Russia to Poland (1763–1794)
- Ivan Pnin

== Sources ==
- Catholic Encyclopedia article "Poland"
- Richard Butterwick, Poland's Last King and English Culture, Oxford University Press, 1998
- Giacomo Casanova, History of My life, Johns Hopkins University Press, 1997
- Isabel de Madariaga, Russia in the Age of Catherine the Great, Yale University Press, 1981, ISBN 0300025157; Phoenix Press, 2002, ISBN 1842125117
- John P. LeDonne, The Grand Strategy of the Russian Empire, 1650-1831, Oxford University Press United States, 2004
- Gerhard Albert Ritter, Frederick the Great, University of California Press, 1975
