= Repnin =

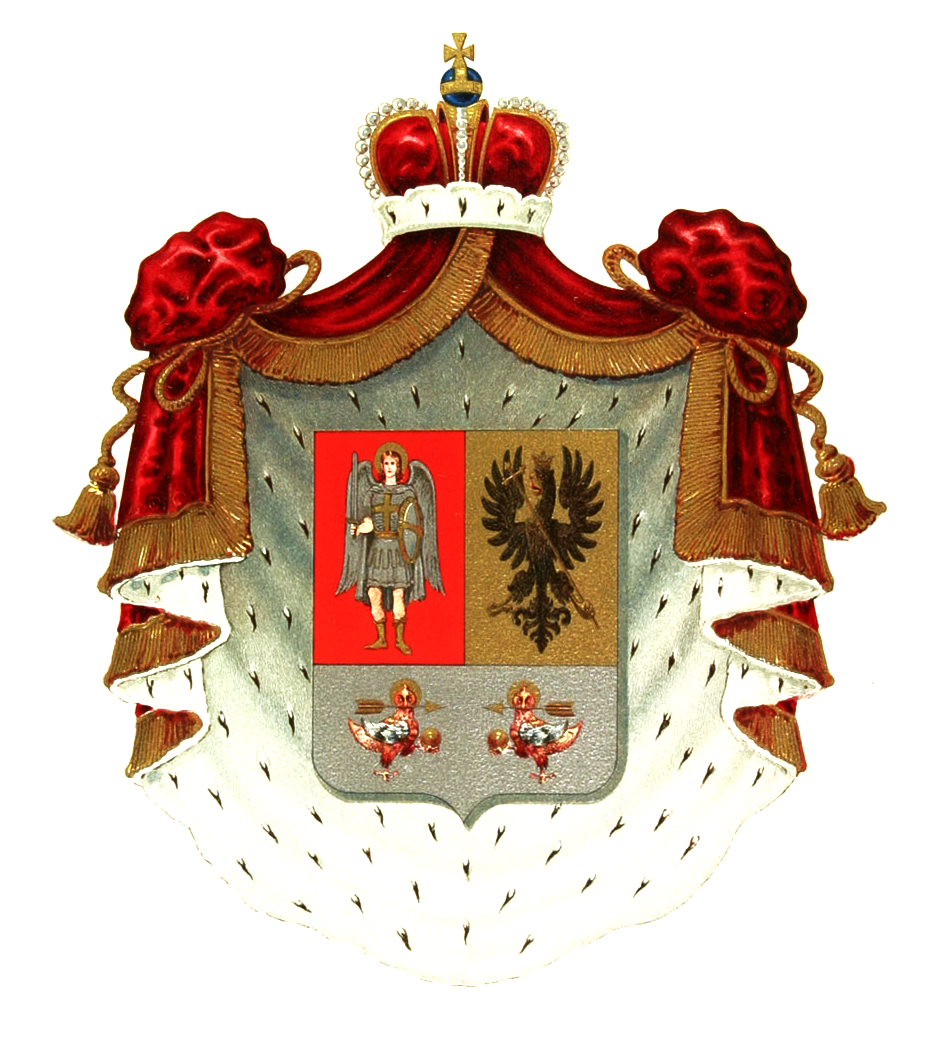
The Repnin coat of arms is composed of the emblems of Kiev and Chernigov.

The House of Repnin (Russian: Репнин), is an ancient Russian princely family, claiming descent from the Olgovichi branch of Rurik dynasty. They held the hereditary title of Knyaz in the Empire of Russia.

== History ==
The family traces its name to Prince Ivan Mikhailovich Obolensky (+1523), nicknamed Repnya, i.e., "bad porridge". Like other Princes Obolensky, he descended from Mikhail Vsevolodovich, prince of Chernigov, who, in 1246, was assassinated by the Mongols.

== Notable members ==
- Princess Elena Mikhailovna Repnina was the first wife of future tsar Vasily Shuisky. The date of marriage is unknown, although they are mentioned together in 1580 as the witnesses in the description of Ivan IV's wedding with Maria Nagaya. She had no children and died possibly in 1592, hypothetically - as the divorced woman in the monastery. The information about her is quite poor. Her grave is unknown. In 1608 Vasily took his 2nd wife Maria Buynosova-Rostovskaya, who become his only tsarina.
- Prince Anikita Ivanovich Repnin (1668-1726), his grandson, who was one of the Russian commanders during the Great Northern War, ending his military career as Field Marshal and Minister of Defense.
- Prince Nikolay Vasilievich Repnin (1734-1801), the latter's son, probably the most illustrious member of the family, noted for his involvement in the Polish affairs and his decisive actions during the Russo-Turkish Wars. He had three daughters and a natural son (Ivan Pnin) but no legitimate male heir, hence Alexander I permitted his grandson Prince Nikolai Volkonsky to take the name Repnin and coat of arms of his grandfather. His descendants are known as Princes Repnin-Volkonsky.
