= Battle of Măcin =

1791 battle of the Russo-Turkish War

- Part of the Russo-Turkish War (1787–1792)
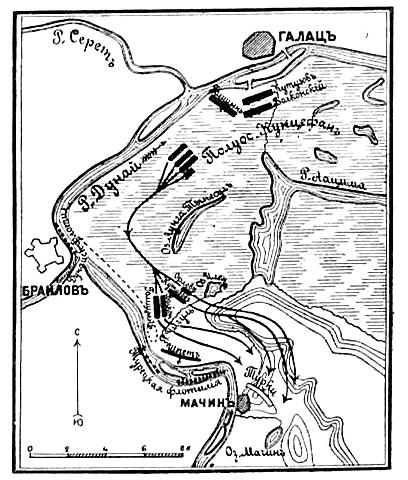
Date	9 July 1791 (Note: An inaccurate date is given by Bodart — 10 July 1791.) (O.S. 28 June)
Location	Măcin, present-day Romania 45°14′44″N 28°7′23″E
Result	Russian victory

Belligerents
Russian Empire	Ottoman Empire

Commanders and leaders
Nicholas Repnin; Mikhail Kutuzov; Grigory Volkonsky; Sergey Golitsyn; Ivan Spaeth	Koca Yusuf Pasha

Strength
30,000–36,000	64,000–80,000 (Note: "According to subsequent evidence". Plus up to 20,000 men arriving from Hirsova are unengaged.)

Casualties and losses
141 killed, 300 wounded Bodart: 1,000	4,000 killed, wounded, and captured 35 cannons 7 small vessels

The Battle of Măcin (Note: also Battle of Maçin, Battle of Machin, Battle of Matchin, Battle of Matschin, Russian: Мачинское сражение) took place during the Russo-Turkish War (1787–1792), fought on 9 July 1791 between the Ottoman Empire and the Russian Empire. The Russian army of 30,000 was commanded by Prince Nicholas Repnin, whereas the Turks, numbering about 80,000 men, were led by Koca Yusuf Pasha.

== Battle ==
Nikolai Repnin drew up a bold plan of attack, which implied that, in spite of any obstacles, they should attack the Ottomans earlier than they could calculate, and earlier than they would gather all the troops of the vizier's army. These troops approached in parts and, at the same time, with a lack of unity and firmness. At the same time, Turkish attacks were decisive and daring in their execution.

Prince Golitsyn's corps marched to the Maçin trenches – the left Ottoman flank – and seized them. Prince Volkonsky's middle corps entered the heights to the left and occupied the Turkish camp in the center. Then the Turkish right-flank army was vanquished by a charge of the Russian left, under Mikhail Illarionovich Kutuzov, and started retreating in disorder. Kutuzov's stroke was conclusive.

The Ottomans, at that time, also intended to attack Golitsyn's right flank and rear from Brailov with a landing force, which Repnin had predicted, but 2 artillery batteries of Major General Spaeth's detachment, left by Repnin for such an occasion, forced the Turkish vessels to withdraw, which lost 7 pieces with the help of Volkonsky and Golitsyn reinforcements.

== Aftermath ==
Repnin gave his troops 2 days rest, having served a thanksgiving. This battle hastened the signing of the Peace of Jassy, as did Ushakov's success at Kaliakria and Suvorov's success at Izmail.

== Citations ==
- Bodart, Gaston (1908). Militär-historisches Kriegs-Lexikon (1618-1905) (in German).
