= Vasily Anikitovich Repnin =

Russian Army General

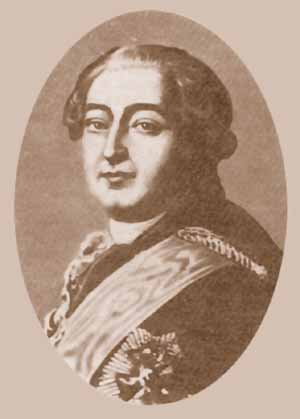

Prince Vasily Anikitovich (Anikitich) Repnin (Russian: Василий Аникитич Репнин; 1696–1748) was a Russian general.

== Life ==
He was the son of prince Anikita Ivanovitch Repnin (1668-1726) and the father of Nikolai Vasilyeich Repnin (1734–1801).

His military posts included commander in chief of the Russian Army during the War of the Austrian Succession (1740-1748) and governor-general of Saint Petersburg (1744). He also led the Rhine Campaign of 1748 and took part in negotiations for the Treaty of Aix-la-Chapelle. He died at Riga and was buried at St. Mary Magdalene's Church alongside his father.

== Sources ==
- "Репнины" . Brockhaus and Efron Encyclopedic Dictionary (in Russian). 1906.
