= Ivan Pnin =

Russian poet

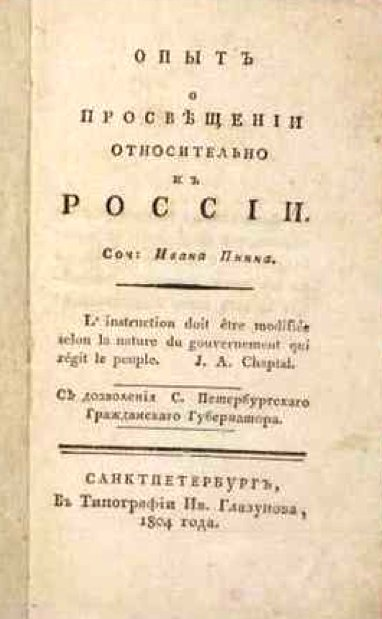
Ivan Pnin, An Essay on Enlightenmebt in Russia

Ivan Petrovich Pnin (Russian: Иван Петрович Пнин; 1773–1805) was a Russian poet and political writer. In accordance with a Russian Illegitimacy custom, Pnin's surname was the abbreviation of that of his father, Prince Nicholas Repnin.

== Biography ==
Born out of wedlock, he famously deplored the status of illegitimate children in his 1802 petition to Alexander I of Russia (Pnin's father was rumored to have also illegitimately fathered Poland's Prince Adam Jerzy Czartoryski.)

Pnin's liberal Essay on the Enlightenment in Russia (1804) attacked Russian serfdom and therefore was banned in the Russian Empire.

The titles of Pnin's best-known poems, Man (1804) and God (1805), mirror Derzhavin's on purpose, as he sought to refute the great poet's idealism by taking up the Deist stance of Radishchev, Volney, and d'Holbach.
