= Army of the Rhine (disambiguation) =

Army of the Rhine may refer to:

== France ==
- Several French armies (Armée du Rhin):
  - Army of the Rhine (1791–1795)
    - Merged into the Army of the Rhine and Moselle from 1795 to 1797
  - Army of the Rhine (1870)
  - Army of the Rhine (1919–30)
  - First Army, called the Army of the Rhine and Danube (1943–45)

== United Kingdom ==
- British Army of the Rhine (BAOR), an army of occupation in Germany post-1918
