= Rhine Campaign of 1748 =

The Rhine Campaign of 1748 was a campaign during the War of the Austrian Succession.

== Background ==
Since early 1746, tense talks had been held in St. Petersburg regarding an Austro-Russian defensive alliance. At the end of May that year a 25-year treaty was signed, according to whose secret articles Russia and Austria pledged to work together against Prussia and the Ottoman Empire. To prevent possible unexpected actions by Frederick the Great, it was decided to keep a large force in Livonia ready to move to Königsberg at a moment's notice from St. Petersburg.

After the French victories under Maurice de Saxe in the Austrian Netherlands in 1746 and 1747, with Austrian assistance, Russia and Britain drew up two treaties pledging that Russia would be provided by Britain and the Dutch Republic with enough money to raise 30,000 men to fight against France.

== Campaign ==
The Austro-Russian treaty was activated in spring 1748, with 30,000 Russian troops under Prince Vassili Anikititch Repnine marching from Livonia to the Rhine via Bohemia and Bavaria to assist Maria Theresa. However, while the Russian force was marching across Germany, Maurice took Maastricht on 7 May and thus deprived the British and the Dutch of their last outpost in Flanders. Repnin only arrived at the Rhine when everything was already over.
