= Siege of Pirna =

1756 siege during the Seven Years' War

- Part of the Third Silesian War (Seven Years' War)
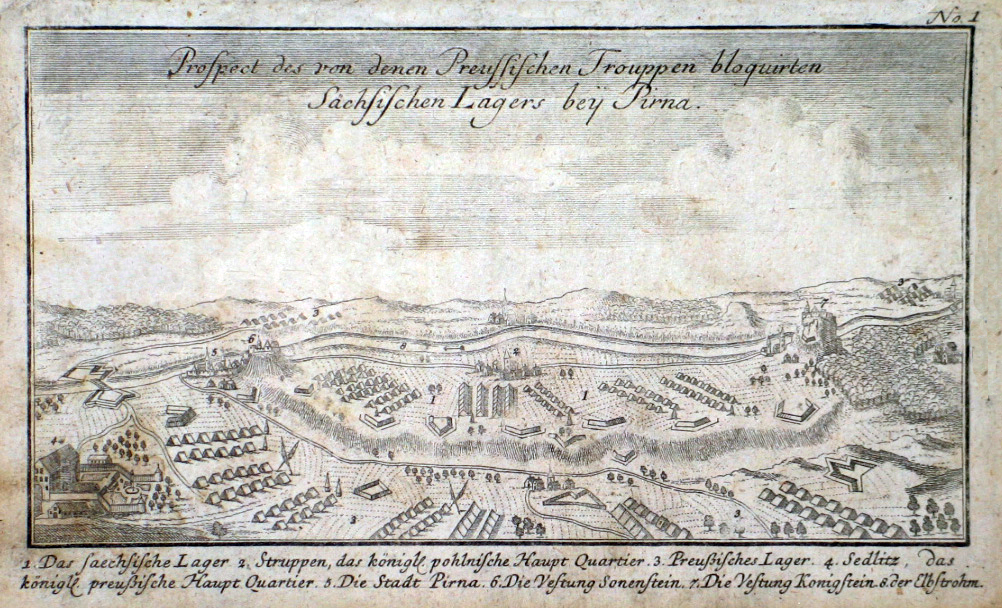
Date	10 September – 14 October 1756
Location	Pirna, Saxony 50.9670°N 13.9330°E
Result	Prussian victory

Belligerents
Prussia	Saxony; Habsburg monarchy

Commanders and leaders
Frederick the Great	Frederick von Rutowski; Maximilian Ulysses Browne

Strength
62,000	(Electorate of Saxony) 20,076 (Habsburg monarchy) 8,000

Casualties and losses
Unknown	15,000 captured 5,000 dead and wounded

Frederick the Great
current battle
First Silesian War
Second Silesian War
Third Silesian War

The Siege of Pirna, sometimes referred to as the Investment of Pirna, took place from 10 September to 14 October 1756 as part of the Prussian invasion of Saxony during the Third Silesian War (part of the Seven Years' War).

Following the occupation of Dresden by Frederick the Great on 9 September 1756, the Saxon army under Frederick von Rutowski had withdrawn southeast and taken up position at the fortified camp of Pirna. The position was tactically strong, as the steep terrain, fortresses, and defensive works added protection, leaving Frederick with no option but to isolate and starve the Saxon army into surrendering. As a result, Frederick encircled the camp and blocked outside support. The Saxons hoped to receive relief from the Austrian army, which was across the border in neighbouring Bohemia under Marshal Browne.

Following the Battle of Lobositz, the Austrians withdrew and tried to approach Pirna by a different route, but they failed to make contact with the defenders. Despite a Saxon attempt to escape by crossing the River Elbe, it soon became apparent that their position was hopeless. On 14 October, Rutowski concluded a capitulation with Frederick.

As a result, about 18,000 troops surrendered. They were swiftly and forcibly incorporated into the Prussian forces, an act which caused widespread protest even from Prussians. Many of them later deserted and fought with the Austrians against the Prussian forces - with whole regiments changing sides at the Battle of Prague.

== Bibliography ==
- Dull, Jonathan R. The French Navy and the Seven Years' War. University of Nebraska Press, 2005.
- Jacques, Tony. Dictionary of Battles and Sieges. Greenwood Press, 2007.
- Szabo, Franz A.J. The Seven Years War in Europe, 1756-1763. Pearson, 2008.
- Showalter, Dennis E. The Wars of Frederick the Great. London: Longman, 1996.
- Duffy, Christopher. The Military Life of Frederick the Great. Atheneum, 1986.
