= March 28 =

March 28 this year in various calendars
- Saturday, 28 March 2026
| Akan | Kwamemene |
| Armenian | 11 Ahekani 1475 |
| Aztec | Huei Tecuilhuitl 17, 13 Cōātl |
| Babylonian | 8 Adaru, 2336 SE |
| Balinese pawukon | Luang, Pepet, Beteng, Sri, Wage, Was, Saniscara of Dukut, Sri, Jangur, Duka |
| Bengali | 14 Chaitro, BS 1432 |
| Chinese | Yin Metal Ox・Willow Mansion; Fire Horse Year, Month 2, Day 10 (Chunfen, 8 days until Qingming) |
| Common Era | 28 March 2026 CE |
| Coptic | 19 Paremhat, AM 1742 |
| Egyptian | 16 Mesori, 2774 NE |
| Ethiopian | 19 Magābit, 2018 Amätä Məhrät |
| French Republican | Décade I, Octidi de Germinal de l'Année 234 de la République |
| Gregorian | 28 March, AD 2026 |
| Hebrew | 10 Nisan, AM 5786 |
| Hindu | Puṣya・Sukarman; Solar: 15 Caitra, 1947 SE; Lunisolar: Daśamī, Śukla pakṣa of Caitra, 2083 VE; Rāudra・5126 KY・1,872,662 |
| Icelandic | Laugardagur, 5 Einmánuður 2025 |
| Islamic | 9 Shawwal, AH 1447 (using tabular method) |
| ISO week date | 2026-W13-6 |
| Japanese | 10 Kisaragi, Reiwa 8 (Shunbun, 8 days until Seimei) |
| Julian | 15 March, AD 2026 (AM 7534) |
| Julian day | 2461128 |
| Korean | 10 Tokkidal, 4359 DE |
| Maya | 13.0.13.8.5; 3 Uayeb, 13 Chicchan |
| Roman | Idibus Martiis, MMDCCLXXIX AUC |
| Solar Hijri | 8 Farvardin, SH 1405 |
| Tibetan | 10 dbo, me pho rta 2153 or 1772 or 1000 |

| << | March | | | | | >> |
| Su | Mo | Tu | We | Th | Fr | Sa |
| 1 | 2 | 3 | 4 | 5 | 6 | 7 |
| 8 | 9 | 10 | 11 | 12 | 13 | 14 |
| 15 | 16 | 17 | 18 | 19 | 20 | 21 |
| 22 | 23 | 24 | 25 | 26 | 27 | 28 |
| 29 | 30 | 31 |
2026

March 28 in recent years
2026 (Saturday)
2025 (Friday)
2024 (Thursday)
2023 (Tuesday)
2022 (Monday)
2021 (Sunday)
2020 (Saturday)
2019 (Thursday)
2018 (Wednesday)
2017 (Tuesday)

March 28 is the 87th day of the year (88th in leap years) in the Gregorian calendar; 278 days remain until the end of the year.

== Events ==
=== Pre-1600 ===
- AD 37 – Roman emperor Caligula accepts the titles of the Principate, bestowed on him by the Senate.
- 193 – After assassinating the Roman Emperor Pertinax, his Praetorian Guards auction off the throne to Didius Julianus.
- 364 – Roman Emperor Valentinian I appoints his brother Flavius Valens co-emperor.
- 1065 – The Great German Pilgrimage, which had been under attack by Bedouin bandits for three days, is rescued by the Fatimid governor of Ramla.
- 1566 – The foundation stone of Valletta, Malta's capital city, is laid by Jean Parisot de Valette, Grand Master of the Sovereign Military Order of Malta.

=== 1601–1900 ===
- 1745 – War of the Austrian Succession: In the Battle of Vilshofen, Austrian forces defeat French forces.
- 1776 – Juan Bautista de Anza finds the site for the Presidio of San Francisco.
- 1795 – Partitions of Poland: The Duchy of Courland and Semigallia, a northern fief of the Polish–Lithuanian Commonwealth, ceases to exist and becomes part of Imperial Russia.
- 1801 – Treaty of Florence is signed, ending the war between the French Republic and the Kingdom of Naples.
- 1802 – Heinrich Wilhelm Matthäus Olbers discovers 2 Pallas, the second asteroid ever to be discovered.
- 1809 – Peninsular War: France defeats Spain in the Battle of Medellín.
- 1814 – War of 1812: In the Battle of Valparaíso, two American naval vessels are captured by two Royal Navy vessels.
- 1842 – First concert of the Vienna Philharmonic Orchestra, conducted by Otto Nicolai.
- 1854 – Crimean War: France and Britain declare war on Russia.
- 1860 – First Taranaki War: The Battle of Waireka begins.
- 1862 – American Civil War: In the Battle of Glorieta Pass, Union forces stop the Confederate invasion of the New Mexico Territory. The battle began on March 26.

=== 1901–present ===
- 1910 – Henri Fabre becomes the first person to fly a seaplane, the Fabre Hydravion, after taking off from water runway Étang le Barre, near Marseille.
- 1918 – General John J. Pershing, during World War I, cancels 42nd 'Rainbow' Division's orders to Rolampont for further training and diverted it to the occupy the Baccarat sector. Rainbow Division becomes "the first American division to take over an entire sector on its own, which it held longer than any other American division-occupied sector alone for a period of three months".
- 1918 – Finnish Civil War: On the so-called "Bloody Maundy Thursday of Tampere", the Whites force the Reds to attack the city center, where the city's fiercest battles being fought in Kalevankangas with large casualties on both sides. During the same day, an explosion at the Red headquarters of Tampere kills several commanders.
- 1920 – Palm Sunday tornado outbreak of 1920 affects the Great Lakes region and Deep South states.
- 1933 – The Imperial Airways biplane City of Liverpool is believed to be the first airliner lost to sabotage when a passenger sets a fire on board.
- 1939 – Spanish Civil War: Generalissimo Francisco Franco conquers Madrid after a three-year siege.
- 1941 – World War II: First day of the Battle of Cape Matapan in Greece between the navies of the United Kingdom and Australia, and the Royal Italian navy.
- 1942 – World War II: A British combined force permanently disables the Louis Joubert Lock in Saint-Nazaire in order to keep the German battleship Tirpitz away from the mid-ocean convoy lanes.
- 1946 – Cold War: The United States Department of State releases the Acheson–Lilienthal Report, outlining a plan for the international control of nuclear power.
- 1959 – The State Council of the People's Republic of China dissolves the government of Tibet.
- 1961 – ČSA Flight 511 crashes in Igensdorf, Germany, killing 52.
- 1963 – Civil rights movement: Over one hundred high school students conduct a sit-in protest in Rome, Georgia.
- 1965 – An M_{w} 7.4 earthquake in Chile sets off a series of tailings dam failures, burying the town of El Cobre and killing at least 500 people.
- 1968 – Brazilian high school student Edson Luís de Lima Souto is killed by military police at a student protest.
- 1969 – Greek poet and Nobel Prize laureate Giorgos Seferis makes a famous statement on the BBC World Service opposing the junta in Greece.
- 1970 – An earthquake strikes western Turkey at about 23:05 local time, killing 1,086 and injuring at least 1,200.
- 1978 – The US Supreme Court hands down 5–3 decision in Stump v. Sparkman, a controversial case involving involuntary sterilization and judicial immunity.
- 1979 – A coolant leak at the Three Mile Island's Unit 2 nuclear reactor outside Harrisburg, Pennsylvania leads to the core overheating and a partial meltdown.
- 1979 – The British House of Commons passes a vote of no confidence against James Callaghan's government by one vote, precipitating a general election.
- 1990 – United States President George H. W. Bush posthumously awards Jesse Owens the Congressional Gold Medal.
- 1994 – In South Africa, African National Congress security guards kill dozens of Inkatha Freedom Party protesters.
- 1999 – Kosovo War: Serb paramilitary and military forces kill at least 130 Kosovo Albanians in Izbica.
- 2001 – Athens International Airport Eleftherios Venizelos begins operation.
- 2003 – In a friendly fire incident, two American A-10 Thunderbolt II aircraft attack British tanks participating in the 2003 invasion of Iraq, killing one soldier.
- 2005 – An earthquake shakes northern Sumatra with a magnitude of 8.6 and killing over 1000 people.
- 2006 – At least one million union members, students and unemployed take to the streets in France in protest at the government's proposed First Employment Contract law.
- 2020 – The region of Uusimaa (with the capital city Helsinki) is temporarily isolated from the rest of Finland due to increased COVID-19 infections.
- 2025 – An earthquake strikes close to Mandalay, Myanmar with a magnitude of 7.7, killing over 5400 people.

== Births ==
=== Pre-1600 ===
- 1472 – Fra Bartolomeo, Italian painter (died 1517)
- 1515 – Teresa of Ávila, Spanish nun and saint (died 1582)
- 1522 – Albert Alcibiades, German prince (died 1557)
- 1592 – John Amos Comenius, Czech bishop and educator (died 1670)

=== 1601–1900 ===
- 1613 – Empress Dowager Xiaozhuang of China (died 1688)
- 1638 – Frederik Ruysch, Dutch botanist and anatomist (died 1731)
- 1652 – Samuel Sewall, English judge (died 1730)
- 1725 – Andrew Kippis, English minister and author (died 1795)
- 1727 – Maximilian III Joseph, Elector of Bavaria, (died 1777)
- 1750 – Francisco de Miranda, Venezuelan general and politician (died 1816)
- 1760 – Thomas Clarkson, English activist (died 1846)
- 1793 – Henry Schoolcraft, American geographer, geologist, and ethnologist (died 1864)
- 1795 – Georg Heinrich Pertz, German historian and author (died 1876)
- 1806 – Thomas Hare, English lawyer and political scientist (died 1891)
- 1811 – John Neumann, Czech-American bishop and saint (died 1860)
- 1815 – Arsène Houssaye, French author and poet (died 1896)
- 1818 – Wade Hampton III, American general and politician, 77th Governor of South Carolina (died 1902)
- 1819 – Joseph Bazalgette, English architect and engineer (died 1891)
- 1832 – Henry D. Washburn, American politician and general (died 1871)
- 1836 – Emmanuel Benner, French artist (died 1896)
- 1836 – Jean Benner, French artist (died 1906)
- 1836 – Frederick Pabst, German-American brewer, founded the Pabst Brewing Company (died 1904)
- 1840 – Emin Pasha, German-Jewish Egyptian physician and politician (died 1892)
- 1847 – Gyula Farkas, Hungarian mathematician and physicist (died 1930)
- 1849 – James Darmesteter, French historian and author (died 1894)
- 1850 – Kyrle Bellew, English theatre actor (died 1911)
- 1851 – Bernardino Machado, Portuguese academic and politician, 3rd President of Portugal (died 1944)
- 1862 – Aristide Briand, French politician, Prime Minister of France, Nobel Prize laureate (died 1932)
- 1868 – Maxim Gorky, Russian novelist, short story writer, and playwright (died 1936)
- 1873 – John Geiger, American rower (died 1956)
- 1879 – Terence MacSwiney, Irish republican, politician, Lord Mayor of Cork, died on hunger strike (died 1920)
- 1881 – Martin Sheridan, Irish-American discus thrower and jumper (died 1918)
- 1884 – Angelos Sikelianos, Greek poet and playwright (died 1951)
- 1887 – Beulah Dark Cloud, American actress (died 1945)
- 1890 – Paul Whiteman, American violinist, composer, and bandleader (died 1967)
- 1892 – Corneille Heymans, Belgian physiologist and academic, Nobel Prize laureate (died 1968)
- 1892 – Tom Maguire, Irish republican General (died 1993)
- 1893 – Spyros Skouras, Greek-American businessman (died 1971)
- 1894 – Ernst Lindemann, German captain (died 1941)
- 1895 – Christian Herter, American politician, United States Secretary of State (died 1966)
- 1895 – Donald Grey Barnhouse, American pastor and theologian (died 1960)
- 1895 – Spencer W. Kimball, American religious leader, 12th President of The Church of Jesus Christ of Latter-day Saints (died 1985)
- 1897 – Sepp Herberger, German footballer and manager (died 1977)
- 1899 – Gussie Busch, American businessman (died 1989)
- 1899 – Buck Shaw, American football player and coach (died 1977)
- 1900 – Edward Wagenknecht, American critic and educator (died 2004)

=== 1901–present ===
- 1902 – Flora Robson, English actress (died 1984)
- 1903 – Rudolf Serkin, Czech-American pianist and educator (died 1991)
- 1904 – Margaret Tucker, Australian author and activist (died 1996)
- 1905 – Pandro S. Berman, American production manager and producer (died 1996)
- 1905 – Marlin Perkins, American zoologist and television host (died 1986)
- 1906 – Murray Adaskin, Canadian violinist, composer, and conductor (died 2002)
- 1906 – Robert Allen, American actor (died 1998)
- 1906 – Dorothy Knowles, South African-English author, fencer and academic (died 2010)
- 1907 – Irving Paul Lazar, American lawyer and talent agent (died 1993)
- 1909 – Nelson Algren, American novelist and short story writer (died 1981)
- 1910 – Jimmie Dodd, American actor and singer-songwriter (died 1964)
- 1910 – Ingrid of Sweden, Queen of Denmark (died 2000)
- 1911 – Consalvo Sanesi, Italian race car driver (died 1998)
- 1912 – A. Bertram Chandler, English-Australian author (died 1984)
- 1912 – Marina Raskova, Russian pilot and navigator (died 1943)
- 1913 – Toko Shinoda, Japanese artist (died 2021)
- 1914 – Edward Anhalt, American screenwriter and producer (died 2000)
- 1914 – Bohumil Hrabal, Czech author (died 1997)
- 1914 – Edmund Muskie, American politician, 64th Governor of Maine, 58th United States Secretary of State (died 1996)
- 1914 – Everett Ruess, American explorer, poet, and painter (died 1934)
- 1915 – Jay Livingston, American singer-songwriter (died 2001)
- 1919 – Tom Brooks, Australian cricket umpire (died 2007)
- 1919 – Eileen Crofton, British physician and author (died 2010)
- 1919 – Vic Raschi, American baseball player and coach (died 1988)
- 1921 – Harold Agnew, American physicist and academic (died 2013)
- 1921 – Dirk Bogarde, English actor and author (died 1999)
- 1922 – Neville Bonner, Australian politician (died 1999)
- 1922 – Grace Hartigan, American painter and educator (died 2008)
- 1922 – Joey Maxim, American boxer and actor (died 2001)
- 1923 – Paul C. Donnelly, American scientist and engineer (died 2014)
- 1923 – Thad Jones, American trumpet player and composer (died 1986)
- 1924 – Freddie Bartholomew, American actor (died 1992)
- 1925 – Innokenty Smoktunovsky, Russian actor (died 1994)
- 1925 – Dorothy DeBorba, American child actress (died 2010)
- 1926 – Cayetana Fitz-James Stuart, 18th Duchess of Alba (died 2014)
- 1926 – Polly Umrigar, Indian cricketer (died 2006)
- 1928 – Zbigniew Brzezinski, Polish-American political activist and analyst; United States National Security Advisor (died 2017)
- 1928 – Alexander Grothendieck, German-French mathematician and theorist (died 2014)
- 1930 – Robert Ashley, American composer (died 2014)
- 1930 – Jerome Isaac Friedman, American physicist and academic, Nobel Prize laureate
- 1933 – Frank Murkowski, American soldier, banker, and politician, 8th Governor of Alaska
- 1934 – Laurie Taitt, Guyanese-English hurdler (died 2006)
- 1935 – Michael Parkinson, English journalist and author (died 2023)
- 1935 – Józef Szmidt, Polish triple jumper (died 2024)
- 1936 – Mario Vargas Llosa, Peruvian writer and politician, Nobel Prize laureate (died 2025)
- 1940 – Tony Barber, English-Australian television host
- 1940 – Luis Cubilla, Uruguayan footballer and coach (died 2013)
- 1940 – Michael Plumb, American equestrian
- 1942 – Daniel Dennett, American philosopher and academic (died 2024)
- 1942 – Neil Kinnock, Welsh politician, Vice-President of the European Commission
- 1942 – Mike Newell, English director and producer
- 1942 – Samuel Ramey, American opera singer
- 1942 – Jerry Sloan, American basketball player and coach (died 2020)
- 1943 – Richard Eyre, English director, producer, and screenwriter
- 1943 – Conchata Ferrell, American actress (died 2020)
- 1944 – Rick Barry, American basketball player
- 1944 – Ken Howard, American actor (died 2016)
- 1945 – Rodrigo Duterte, Filipino politician, 16th President of the Philippines
- 1946 – Wubbo Ockels, Dutch physicist and astronaut (died 2014)
- 1946 – Henry Paulson, American banker and politician, 74th United States Secretary of the Treasury
- 1946 – Alejandro Toledo, Peruvian economist and politician, President of Peru
- 1947 – David McKinley, American politician (died 2026)
- 1948 – Janice Lynde, American actress
- 1948 – Dianne Wiest, American actress
- 1948 – Milan Williams, American keyboard player (died 2006)
- 1949 – Ronnie Ray Smith, American sprinter (died 2013)
- 1953 – Melchior Ndadaye, Burundian banker and politician, 4th President of Burundi (died 1993)
- 1954 – Donald Brown, American pianist and educator
- 1955 – Reba McEntire, American singer-songwriter and actress
- 1957 – Harvey Glance, American sprinter (died 2023)
- 1958 – Edesio Alejandro, Cuban composer (died 2025)
- 1958 – Curt Hennig, American wrestler (died 2003)
- 1959 – Laura Chinchilla, Costa Rican politician, 46th President of Costa Rica
- 1960 – José Maria Neves, Cape Verdeian politician, 4th Prime Minister of Cape Verde
- 1961 – Byron Scott, American basketball player and coach
- 1962 – Jure Franko, Slovenian skier
- 1962 – Simon Bazalgette, English businessman
- 1964 – Karen Lumley, English politician (died 2023)
- 1968 – Iris Chang, Chinese-American journalist and author (died 2004)
- 1968 – Nasser Hussain, Indian-English cricketer and sportscaster
- 1969 – Brett Ratner, American director and producer
- 1970 – Vince Vaughn, American actor
- 1970 – Jennifer Weiner, American journalist and author
- 1972 – Keith Tkachuk, American ice hockey player
- 1973 – Björn Kuipers, Dutch footballer and referee
- 1973 – Umaga, American Samoan wrestler (died 2009)
- 1975 – Kate Gosselin, American television personality
- 1975 – Iván Helguera, Spanish footballer
- 1978 – Nathan Cayless, Australian-New Zealand rugby league player and coach
- 1979 – Shakib Khan, Bangladeshi film actor, producer, singer and media personality
- 1980 – Stiliani Pilatou, Greek long jumper
- 1980 – Luke Walton, American basketball player
- 1981 – Aleksandra Leo, Polish politician and lawyer
- 1981 – Edwar Ramírez, American baseball player
- 1981 – Julia Stiles, American actress
- 1983 – Ladji Doucouré, French sprinter and hurdler
- 1984 – Christopher Samba, Congolese footballer
- 1985 – Stefano Ferrario, Italian footballer
- 1985 – Steve Mandanda, French footballer
- 1985 – Stanislas Wawrinka, Swiss tennis player
- 1985 – Josh Bray, American politician
- 1986 – Mustafa Ali, American wrestler
- 1986 – Bowe Bergdahl, American sergeant
- 1986 – Lady Gaga, American singer-songwriter and actress
- 1986 – J-Kwon, American rapper
- 1986 – Barbora Strýcová, Czech tennis player
- 1987 – Yohan Benalouane, French-Tunisian footballer
- 1987 – Simeon Jackson, Canadian soccer player
- 1987 – Jonathan Van Ness, American hairdresser and television personality
- 1988 – Geno Atkins, American football player
- 1988 – Ryan Kalish, American baseball player
- 1989 – Logan Couture, Canadian ice hockey player
- 1989 – Lukas Jutkiewicz, English footballer
- 1989 – Mira Leung, Canadian figure skater
- 1990 – Delroy Edwards, American musician
- 1990 – Laura Harrier, American actress and model
- 1991 – Derek Carr, American football player
- 1991 – Jordan McRae, American basketball player
- 1991 – Lisa-Maria Moser, Austrian tennis player
- 1991 – Marie-Philip Poulin, Canadian ice hockey player
- 1991 – Ondřej Palát, Czech ice hockey player
- 1991 – Christian Walker, American baseball player
- 1991 – Hoya, South Korean singer and dancer
- 1992 – Sergi Gómez, Spanish footballer
- 1994 – Jackson Wang, Hong Kong rapper
- 1995 – Jonathan Drouin, Canadian ice hockey player
- 1995 – Will Smith, American baseball player
- 1996 – Matt Renshaw, English-Australian cricketer
- 1996 – Max Strus, American basketball player
- 1998 – Lance Morris, Australian cricketer
- 2001 – Wang Xiyu, Chinese tennis player
- 2004 – Anna Shcherbakova, Russian figure skater

== Deaths ==
=== Pre-1600 ===
- 193 – Pertinax, Roman emperor (born 126)
- 592 – Guntram, French king (born 532)
- 966 – Flodoard, Frankish canon and chronicler
- 1072 – Ordulf, Duke of Saxony
- 1134 – Stephen Harding, founder of the Cistercian order
- 1239 – Emperor Go-Toba of Japan (born 1180)
- 1241 – Valdemar II of Denmark (born 1170)
- 1285 – Pope Martin IV
- 1346 – Venturino of Bergamo, Dominican preacher (born 1304)
- 1563 – Heinrich Glarean, Swiss poet and theorist (born 1488)
- 1566 – Sigismund von Herberstein, Austrian historian and diplomat (born 1486)
- 1584 – Ivan the Terrible, Russian king (born 1530)

=== 1601–1900 ===
- 1687 – Constantijn Huygens, Dutch poet and composer (born 1596)
- 1690 – Emmanuel Tzanes, Greek Renaissance painter (born 1610)
- 1718 – Thomas Micklethwaite, Lord Commissioner of the Treasury (born 1678)
- 1818 – Antonio Capuzzi, Italian violinist and composer (born 1755)
- 1822 – Angelis Govios, leader of the Greek War of Independence (born 1780)
- 1868 – James Brudenell, 7th Earl of Cardigan, English lieutenant and politician (born 1797)
- 1870 – George Henry Thomas, American general (born 1816)
- 1874 – Peter Andreas Hansen, Danish-German astronomer and mathematician (born 1795)
- 1881 – Modest Mussorgsky, Russian pianist and composer (born 1839)
- 1884 – Georgios Zariphis, Greek banker and financier (born 1810)
- 1893 – Edmund Kirby Smith, American general (born 1824)
- 1900 – Piet Joubert, South African soldier and politician (born c. 1831)

=== 1901–present ===
- 1903 – Magdalene Thoresen, Danish writer (born 1819)
- 1910 – Édouard Colonne, French violinist and conductor (born 1838)
- 1916 – James Strachan-Davidson, English classical scholar, academic administrator, translator, and author (born 1843)
- 1917 – Albert Pinkham Ryder, American painter (born 1847)
- 1923 – Charles Hubbard, American archer (born 1849)
- 1929 – Katharine Lee Bates, American poet and songwriter (born 1859)
- 1929 – Lomer Gouin, Canadian lawyer and politician, Premier of Quebec (born 1861)
- 1934 – Mahmoud Mokhtar, Egyptian sculptor and educator (born 1891)
- 1941 – Marcus Hurley, American basketball player and cyclist (born 1883)
- 1941 – Virginia Woolf, English writer (born 1882)
- 1942 – Miguel Hernández, Spanish poet and playwright (born 1910)
- 1943 – Sergei Rachmaninoff, Russian pianist, composer, and conductor (born 1873)
- 1944 – Stephen Leacock, English-Canadian political scientist and author (born 1869)
- 1947 – Karol Świerczewski, Polish general (born 1897)
- 1953 – Jim Thorpe, American football player and Olympic gold medalist (born 1887)
- 1957 – Stylianos Lenas, Greek-Cypriot member of the National Organisation of Cypriot Fighters (EOKA) against the British rule (born 1931)
- 1958 – W. C. Handy, American trumpet player and composer (born 1873)
- 1962 – Hugo Wast, Argentinian author (born 1883)
- 1963 – Antonius Bouwens, Dutch target shooter (born 1876)
- 1965 – Clemence Dane, English author and playwright (born 1888)
- 1969 – Dwight D. Eisenhower, American general and politician, 34th President of the United States (born 1890)
- 1972 – Donie Bush, American baseball player, manager, and team owner (born 1887)
- 1974 – Arthur Crudup, American singer-songwriter and guitarist (born 1905)
- 1974 – Dorothy Fields, American songwriter (born 1905)
- 1974 – Françoise Rosay, French actress (born 1891)
- 1976 – Richard Arlen, American actor (born 1899)
- 1977 – Eric Shipton, English mountaineer and explorer (born 1907)
- 1979 – Emmett Kelly, American clown and actor (born 1898)
- 1980 – Dick Haymes, Argentinian-American actor and singer (born 1918)
- 1982 – William Giauque, Canadian chemist and academic, Nobel Prize laureate (born 1895)
- 1985 – Marc Chagall, Russian-French painter (born 1887)
- 1986 – Virginia Gilmore. American actress (born 1919)
- 1987 – Maria von Trapp, Austrian-American singer (born 1905)
- 1992 – Nikolaos Platon, Greek archaeologist (born 1909)
- 1994 – Eugène Ionesco, Romanian-French playwright and critic (born 1909)
- 1996 – Shin Kanemaru, Japanese politician, Deputy Prime Minister of Japan (born 1914)
- 2000 – Anthony Powell, English soldier and author (born 1905)
- 2004 – Peter Ustinov, English-Swiss actor, director, producer, and screenwriter (born 1921)
- 2005 – Moura Lympany, English-Monacan pianist (born 1916)
- 2005 – Robin Spry, Canadian director, producer, and screenwriter (born 1939)
- 2006 – Pro Hart, Australian painter (born 1928)
- 2006 – Charles Schepens, Belgian-American ophthalmologist and author (born 1912)
- 2006 – Caspar Weinberger, American captain, lawyer, and politician, 15th United States Secretary of Defense (born 1917)
- 2009 – Maurice Jarre, French-American composer and conductor (born 1924)
- 2009 – Janet Jagan, 6th President of Guyana (born 1920)
- 2010 – June Havoc, American actress, dancer, and director (born 1912)
- 2012 – John Arden, English author and playwright (born 1930)
- 2012 – Ioannis Banias, Greek politician (born 1939)
- 2012 – Harry Crews, American novelist (born 1935)
- 2012 – Addie L. Wyatt, African American labor leader (born 1924)
- 2013 – George E. P. Box, English-American statistician and educator (born 1919)
- 2013 – Richard Griffiths, English actor (born 1947)
- 2013 – Hugh McCracken, American guitarist, harmonica player, and producer (born 1942)
- 2013 – Bob Teague, American college football star and television news-reporter (born 1929)
- 2013 – Gus Triandos, American baseball player and scout (born 1930)
- 2014 – Jeremiah Denton, American admiral and politician (born 1924)
- 2014 – Lorenzo Semple, Jr., American screenwriter and producer (born 1923)
- 2015 – Chuck Brayton, American baseball player and coach (born 1925)
- 2015 – Joseph Cassidy, Canadian-English priest and academic (born 1954)
- 2015 – Miroslav Ondříček, Czech cinematographer (born 1934)
- 2015 – Gene Saks, American actor and director (born 1921)
- 2016 – James Noble, American actor (born 1922)
- 2021 – Didier Ratsiraka, Malagasy politician and naval officer (born 1936)
- 2021 – Joseph Edward Duncan, American serial killer (born 1963)
- 2023 – Paul O'Grady, English comedian, actor and drag queen (born 1955)
- 2023 – Ryuichi Sakamoto, Japanese composer, record producer, and actor (born 1952)
- 2024 – Larry Lloyd, English professional football player and coach (born 1948)
- 2024 – Mark Spiro, American songwriter, record producer and recording artist (born 1957)
- 2026 – Marinella, Greek singer (born 1938)
- 2026 – Mary Beth Hurt, American actress (born 1946)
- 2026 – Liamine Zéroual, Algerian politician, 6th President of Algeria (born 1941)

== Holidays and observances ==
- Christian feast day:
  - Christopher Wharton
  - Jeanne-Marie de Maille
  - Józef Sebastian Pelczar
  - Priscus
  - Pope Sixtus III
  - Stephen Harding
  - March 28 (Eastern Orthodox liturgics)
- Serfs Emancipation Day (Tibet)
- Teachers' Day (Czech Republic and Slovakia)
