= Charles Louis Auguste Fouquet, duc de Belle-Isle =

French general and statesman (1684–1761)

Marshal of France Charles Louis Auguste Fouquet Duke of Belle-Isle
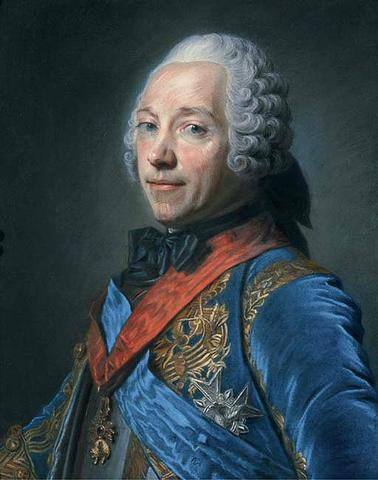
- Portrait by Maurice Quentin de La Tour exhibited at the Salon of 1748

29th Secretary of State for War
- In office 3 March 1758 – 26 January 1761
- Monarch: Louis XV
- Preceded by: Marc-René de Voyer, marquis de Paulmy
- Succeeded by: Étienne François, duc de Choiseul

Personal details
- Born: 22 September 1684 Villefranche-de-Rouergue, Belle-Isle, France
- Died: 26 January 1761 (aged 76)
- Relations: Louis Charles Armand Fouquet (brother)
- Awards: Order of the Holy Spirit; Order of the Golden Fleece

Military service
- Allegiance: Kingdom of France
- Branch/service: French Royal Army
- Rank: Marshal of France
- Battles/wars: War of the Spanish Succession; War of the Quadruple Alliance; War of the Polish Succession; War of the Austrian Succession; Seven Years' War

Charles Louis Auguste Fouquet
- The Marshal-Duke of Belle-Isle
- Full name: Charles Louis Auguste Fouquet
- Born: 22 September 1684; Villefranche-de-Rouergue, France
- Died: 22 January 1761 (aged 76); Versailles, France
- Spouses: Henriette Françoise de Durfort (May 20, 1721); Marie Casimire de Béthune (1729)
- Issue: Louis Marie, comte de Gisors
- Father: Louis Fouquet, marquis de Belle-Isle
- Mother: Catherine Agnès de Lévis

Charles Louis Auguste Fouquet, duc de Belle-Isle (French: [ʃaʁl lwi oɡyst fukɛ]; 22 September 1684 – 26 January 1761) was a French general and statesman.

== Life and career ==
He was born in Villefranche-de-Rouergue, Belle-Isle, Rouergue. He was the grandson of Nicolas Fouquet, who served as Superintendent of Finances under Louis XIV. His family was in disgrace because of Fouquet's brash ambition in the eyes of Louis XIV. Determined to blot out his family's prior disgrace, he entered the army at an early age and was made proprietary colonel of a dragoon regiment in 1708. He rose during the War of the Spanish Succession to the rank of brigadier, and in March 1718 to that of Maréchal de Camp. He was present at the capture of Fuenterrabía in 1718 and of San Sebastián in 1719 during the War of the Quadruple Alliance (1718–1720).

Aided by the rise of Cardinal Fleury, Belle-Isle was made lieutenant-général, and grew in influence over French military policy. In the War of the Polish Succession he commanded a corps under the orders of Marshal Berwick, capturing Trier and Traben-Trarbach and taking part in the Siege of Philippsburg in 1734. When peace was made in 1736, Louis XV gave Belle-Isle the governments of three important fortresses, Metz, Toul and Verdun, offices that he would hold until his death. This was in recognition of both his military services and of his taking part in the negotiations for the cession of Lorraine.

Belle-Isle's military and political reputation was now at its height, and he was one of the government's principal advisers on military and diplomatic affairs. In 1741 he was sent on diplomatic mission to Frankfurt, Germany, as French Plenipotentiary to carry out, in the interests of France, a grand scheme of political reorganisation in the moribund empire, and especially to obtain the election of Charles Albert, Elector of Bavaria as emperor. The long tradition of Franco-Austrian rivalry had crystallised around Belle-Isle, who had emerged as the leader of the bellicose bloc of French policy makers towards the House of Austria. In the eventful year of 1741, he was at the masthead of French interventionist policy in Germany—characterised by scholar Richard Lodge as a "scheme for the humiliation of the House of Austria"—and of the beginnings of the War of the Austrian Succession. French aggression was in large part made possible by the precedent set by the Frederick II of Prussia and his conquest of Silesia. France's initial victories—including the election of Charles Albert to Holy Roman Emperor—were short lived, and by 1743 the war was proving to be very disappointing for France, as Belle-Isle's military command in Germany was full of setbacks and losses. His aggressive strategy towards Austria was predicated on the swift defeat of an impotent and disorganised Austria, along with the lynchpin that was Franco-Prussian alliance.

Belle-Isle was named Maréchal de France in 1741 and received control of a large army, with which it is said that he promised to make peace in three months under the walls of Vienna. The truth of this story is open to question, for no one knew better than Belle-Isle the limitations imposed upon commanders by the military and political circumstances of the times. He was, according to one scholar, "the most important single influence on French policy in the crucial year of 1741."

However, the circumstances in which he found himself severely limited his efforts both as a general and as a statesman. Following his initial victories, Belle-Isle suffered regression and defeat. This was at least partly because Frederick the Great, having already accomplished his aims, pulled Prussia out of the war prematurely, leaving Belle-Isle at the mercy of a much larger Austrian army. Despite the desperate circumstances, however, the daring French retreat from Prague would distinguish Belle-Isle's military brilliance and bravery. In ten days he led 14,000 men—5000 men stayed in the city under the command of François de Chevert—into and across the Upper Palatine Forest whilst being harassed by the enemy's light cavalry and suffering great hardships. But by never allowing himself to be cut off, he was able to reach the relative safety of Eger, after losing 1500 men. His subordinate, François de Chevert, and his 5000 men, defended Prague so well that the Austrians allowed them to leave the city through an honourable capitulation. The means by which this was obtained supposedly included Chevert threatening to burn down the city.

The campaign, however, had discredited Belle-Isle; he was ridiculed in Paris and Fleury is said to have turned against him, and to complete his misfortunes, he was taken prisoner by British forces while going from Cassel to Berlin through Hanover.

He remained a prisoner of war in England for a year, in spite of the demands of Louis XV and Charles VII, Holy Roman Emperor. During the French campaigns of 1746–47, Belle-Isle was in command at the Alpine frontier. There his younger brother, the Chevalier de Belle-Isle, served under his command. The younger Belle-Isle led the French army sent to invade Piedmont where he was killed at the Battle of Assietta. Following the defeat, French forces were weakened and demoralised. However, the elder Belle-Isle still managed to repel a follow-up invasion of the Provence by Austrian and Italian forces and pushed the fighting back into the plain of Lombardy. At the peace, having thus retrieved his military reputation from the disasters of 1742–43, Belle-Isle was made a Peer of France in 1748. King Louis XV would make him Secretary of State for War in 1758, a position Belle-Isle would hold until his death in 1761.

During his three years as Secretary of War, Belle-Isle undertook many reforms. Most important was the development of a French military school for officers, seeing as the officer corps had been shown to be inadequate during the wars of the past few decades. These included the suppression of the proprietary colonelcies of nobles who were too young to command; and he instituted an Order of Merit. These reforms of the officer corps were similar to the structure of the Prussian army in that they attempted to place merit and honour above the blind appointments of nobility. The success of his reforms is debated, because by this time the Seven Years' War was in progress. According to one scholar, Walter L. Dorn, Belle-Isle's efforts came "too late to make a difference" in the war and the continuing decline of French military power.

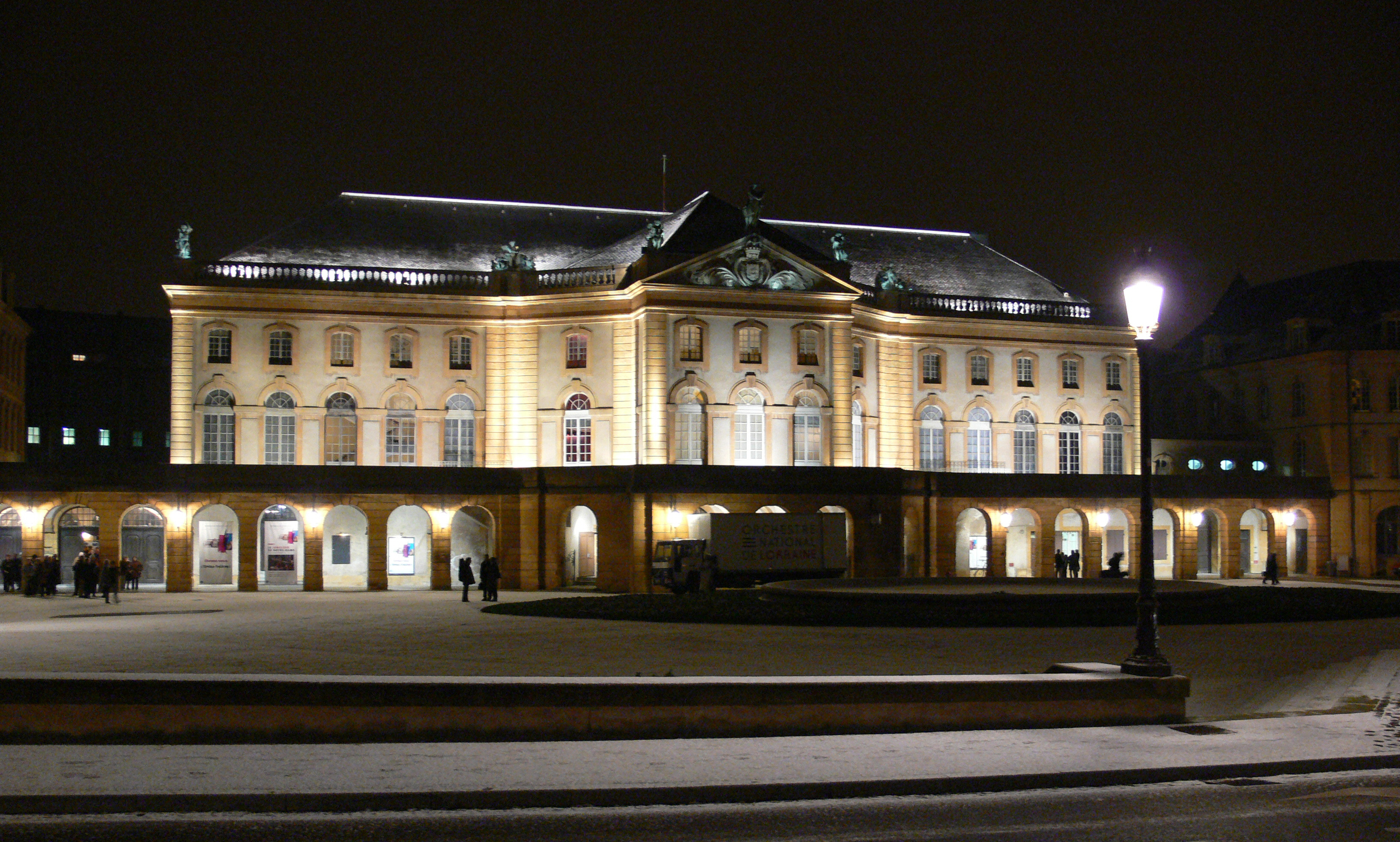
The opera house of Metz, built during the dukedom of Belle-Isle over the city

Belle-Isle was a close friend of Count Saint-Germain and in 1760 allowed him to travel to The Hague in order to secure a peace treaty, obtain funding for France, and set up a whole separate company to manage France's treasury. The French Foreign Minister, Duc de Choiseul, was strongly against this and tried to have Count Saint-Germain arrested.

Belle-Isle held an interest in literature throughout his life, and was elected a member of the French National Academy in 1740; so he founded the National Academy of Metz in 1760. Also, Belle-Isle is regarded today as a builder-ruler. As benefactor of the city, he initiated during his dukedom the modernisation of the centre of Metz in a context of Enlightenment. Belle-Isle awarded royal architect Jacques-François Blondel for the embellishment of the town square and the construction of the city hall, the parliament, and the guardhouse lodging. He also decided the edification of the royal Governor and Intendant palaces and the opera house of Metz, describing it as "one of the most beautiful of France's opera-theatres" at his time. Just before his death, he stated: "The city of Metz is my mistress." However, his dukedom over Metz would end with his death because his only son, the Comte de Gisors, had been killed on 23 June 1758 in the Battle of Krefeld. A commemorative plate honours him today on the forecourt of the opera house of Metz.

== Notes ==
=== References ===
- Anderson, M. S. (1995). The War of the Austrian Succession 1740–1748. New York: Longman. ISBN 9780582059504.
- Cooper-Oakley, Isabella (1912). The Comte De Saint Germain, the Secret of Kings (2nd ed.). London: Whitefriars Press.
- Dorn, Walter L. (1940). Competition for Empire 1740–1763. London: Harper & Brothers.
- Hassall, Arthur (1896). The Balance of Power 1715–1789. London: Macmillan.
- Lodge, Richard (1970). Studies in Eighteenth-Century Diplomacy 1740–1748. Westport, CT: Greenwood Press.
- Scott, Hamish M. (2006). The Birth of a Great Power System 1740–1815. New York: Pearson/Longman. ISBN 9780582217171.

Preceded by Marc-René de Voyer, marquis de Paulmy	Secretary of State for War; 3 March 1758 – 27 January 1761	Succeeded by Étienne François, duc de Choiseul
