= Opéra-Théâtre de Metz Métropole =

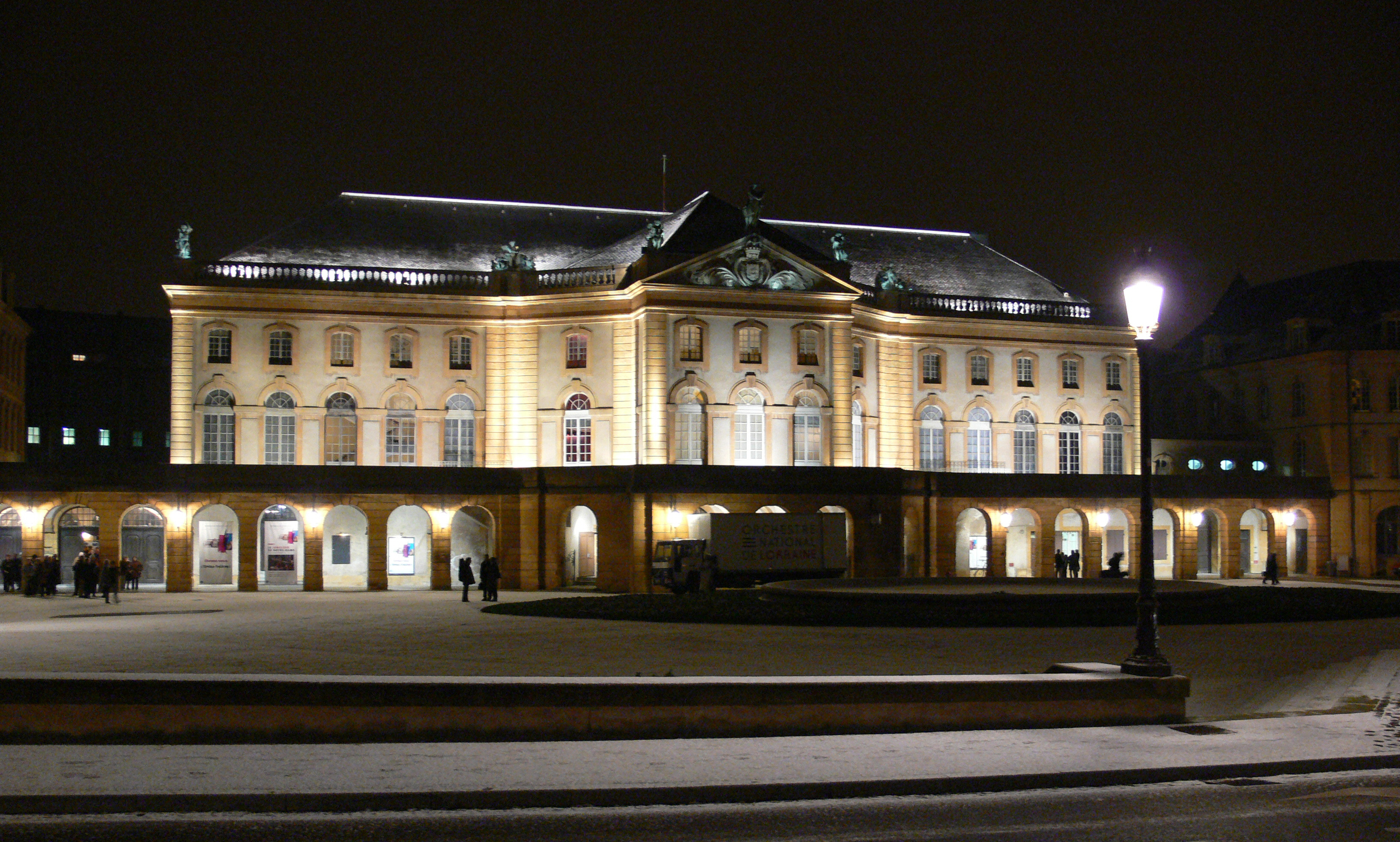
- Exterior of the Opéra-Théâtre de Metz Métropole
- Interactive map of the Opéra-Théâtre de Metz Métropole area
- Alternative names: Opéra-Théâtre de Metz, Metz Opera

General information
- Type: Opera house
- Architectural style: Neo-Classical
- Location: Place de la Comédie, Metz, France
- Coordinates: 49°7′18″N 6°10′22″E
- Construction started: 1732
- Inaugurated: 1752
- Owner: Communauté d’Agglomération de Metz Métropole

Design and construction
- Architect: Jacques Oger

References
- Official website of the Opéra-Théatre de Metz Métropole

The Opéra-Théâtre de Metz Métropole (French pronunciation: [opeʁateɑtʁ də mɛs metʁɔpɔl]), also known as the Metz Opera, is a 750-seat opera house and theatre located on the Petit-Saulcy island in Metz, capital of the Lorraine region, France. It is the oldest opera house working in France and one of the oldest in Europe. It is also one of the last possessing its own costume atelier in France.

== Construction and architecture ==
In 1732, Duke de Belle-Isle, governor of the Three Bishoprics and benefactor of Metz, decided the urban planning of the Petit-Saulcy island (then used to stock firewood, and occasionally for horse-fairs), in order built in Metz a modern square in a context of the Enlightenment. The island was drained and the embankments and four bridges were built, connecting the medieval town to the island. The edification of the opera house was conducted by Messin architect Jacques Oger. Adjacent to the opera house, the urban planning included also the construction of the Royal Intendant palace by architect Barthélemy Bourdet.

The construction of the opera house extended from 1732 to 1752, the War of the Austrian Succession interrupting the works for eight years. The Tuscany-influenced neo-Classical building is finally inaugurated with a public ball on February 3, 1752. The duke of Belle-Isle described it as "one of the most beautiful of France's opera-theatres" at his time, seating 1,382.

During the French Revolution, a guillotine for executions was erected on the parvise of the opera house, the Comedy Square. In 1858, local sculptor Charles Pêtre, then member of the School of Metz artistic movement, adorned its facade with allegories of Tragedy, Inspiration, Lyric Poetry, Comedy, and Music. The most recent restoration took place between 1981 and 1982 remodelling the interior of the opera house to improve comfort and sightlines. The performance hall had been reduced to 750 seats in 1963.

== Performance and cultural policy ==
In the few years after its inauguration it staged several plays from the classic repertoire of the time, including those by Racine, Pierre Corneille, and Molière, whereas towards the end of the ancien régime more contemporary plays by Voltaire, Marivaux, Diderot, and Beaumarchais. As far as opera was concerned, opéra comiques by Grétry, and Montsigny were staged, as well as operas of Jean-Baptiste Lully.

Nineteenth century performances represented the work of both the major dramatists of the era (e.g., Hernani by Victor Hugo appearing just after its Paris premiere) and the major opera composers such as Weber, Vincenzo Bellini, and Donizetti, as well as the grand operas of Meyerbeer, Fromental Halévy, and Daniel Auber. During the season 1894–95, the theatre presented 187 events, of which 135 were in French and 52 in German.

The Metz Opera-Theatre is fused in a unique Lorraine artistic pole with the National Opera of Lorraine. Today, the Opera-Theatre features annually around sixty performances, including plays, choreographies, and lyric poetry.

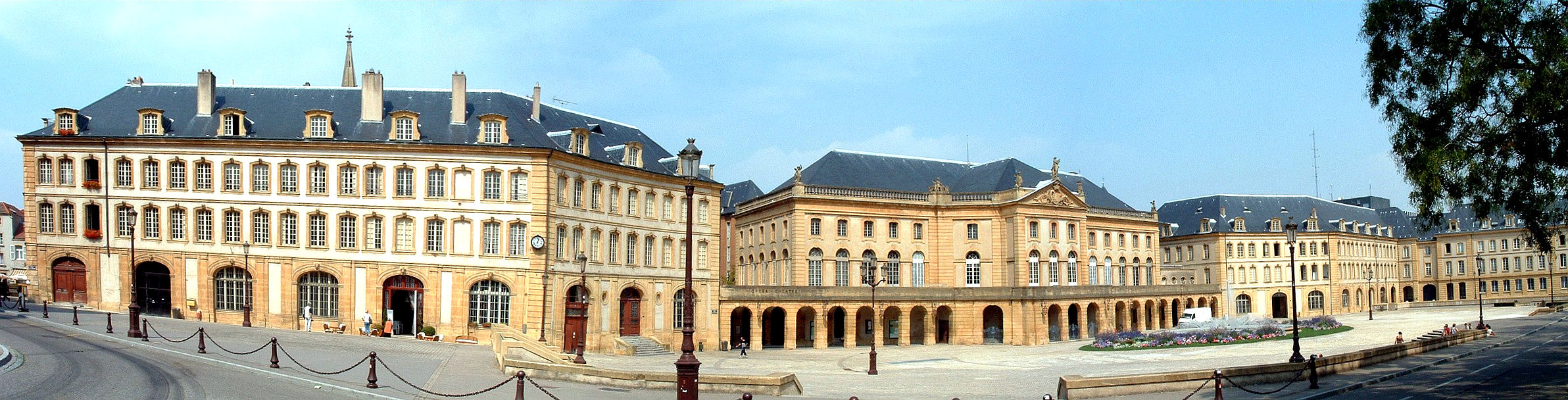
Opera-Theatrecon of Metz Metropole on the Comedy Square

== See also ==
- List of opera houses
