= Battle of Krefeld =

1758 battle of the Seven Years' War

Coordinates: 51°18′10″N 6°30′39″E

- Part of the Seven Years' War
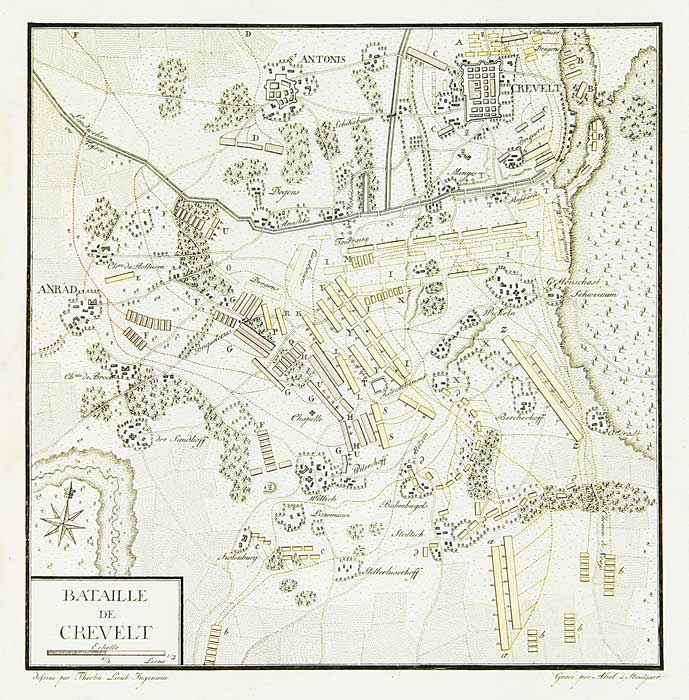
- Battle of Krefeld
| Date | 23 June 1758 |
| Location | Krefeld, present-day North Rhine-Westphalia |
| Result | Allied victory |

Belligerents
| (Province of Hanover) Hanover; Prussia; Hesse-Kassel (Note: No British troops were present, although there is a claim that includes Great Britain as a participant; the first British contingent joined Brunswick on 21 August.) | France |

Commanders and leaders
| (Province of Hanover) Duke of Brunswick | (Kingdom of France) Louis de Bourbon |

Strength
| 31,000–32,000 men | 47,000 men |

Casualties and losses
| 1,700–2,100 | 4,000–5,900 |

The Battle of Krefeld (sometimes referred to by its French name of Créfeld, and as Creveld) was fought at Krefeld near the Rhine on 23 June 1758 between a German army (Note: Westphalen (1859) gives the composition of the army.) under Duke Ferdinand of Brunswick-Wolfenbüttel and a French army under Count Louis of Clermont during the Seven Years' War. As a result of this Ferdinand's victory, the British government eventually decided to reinforce him with 2,000 cavalry and 4,000 infantry from the island.

By the time of the battle, the French army in Germany had deteriorated due to poor provisions, poor administration, and constant retreats; all this also had an impact on the soldiers' morale. Its presence there was marked by major defeats such as Krefeld, Rossbach in 1757, and Minden in 1759.

== Background ==
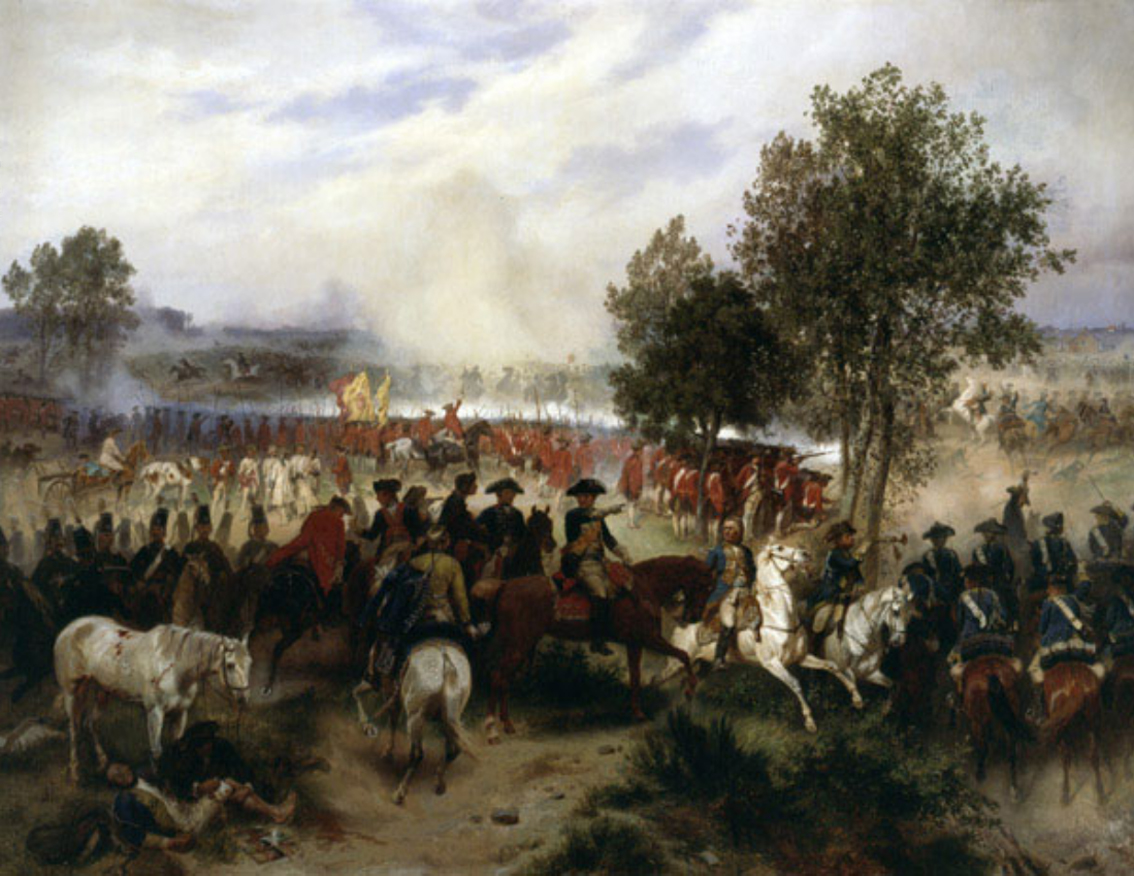
The Battle of Krefeld on a painting by Emil Hünten

The Hanoverian Army led by Ferdinand, the Duke of Brunswick and brother-in-law of Prussian King Frederick the Great, had driven the French led by the Comte de Clermont back across the Rhine. Ferdinand's own army had crossed to the left bank of the Rhine and was now in a position to threaten the frontier of France itself. The Battle of Rheinberg fought on 12 June proved indecisive. Clermont, who had recently replaced the Duc de Richelieu in command of the French army, was attempting to stem Ferdinand's advance. He chose a defensive line on the south side of a walled canal running roughly east and west. Thus the walled canal constituted a sort of natural fortification that Clermont thought would be easy to defend.

== Battle ==
The allied Prussian and Hanoverian troops led by the Duke of Brunswick seized the initiative attacking the entrenched defensive French forces. (Note: No British troops were present; the first British contingent joined Brunswick on 21 August.) After feigning an attack against Clermont's own right flank, Ferdinand executed a wide flanking march, crossing the canal out of sight of the French and emerging from a wooded area on Clermont's left flank. Clermont, who had just sat down for a midday meal, was late in sending reinforcements and, as a result, his left flank was crushed.

The Comte de Gisors, the popular, charismatic, only child of the French minister of war, the Duc de Belle-Isle, was mortally wounded while charging at the head of the French Carabiniers. The Comte de St. Germain, who commanded the French left wing, was nevertheless able to put together a sufficient defense to prevent a complete rout, and the French army retired from the field in relatively good order.

== Aftermath ==
The Erbprinz Charles William Ferdinand, son of the ruling Duke of Brunswick-Lüneburg, who would die of wounds received at the battle of Jena in 1806 during the Napoleonic Wars, particularly distinguished himself commanding the allied flanking troops. Clermont asked to be relieved of his command after this defeat, and his wish was granted. He was succeeded in command by Marshal de Contades.
