= Louis Marie Fouquet, Count of Gisors =

French nobleman (1732–1758)

Louis Marie Fouquet
- Count of Gisors
- Coat of arms
- Full name: Louis Marie Fouquet
- Born: 27 March 1732; Metz, France
- Died: 26 June 1758 (aged 26); Côte-d'Or, France
- Spouse: Hélène Mancini (23 May 1753)
- Issue: no issue
- Father: Charles Louis Auguste Fouquet
- Mother: Marie Casimire de Béthune

Louis Marie Fouquet, Count of Gisors (French: [lwi maʁi fukɛ]; 27 March 1732 – 26 June 1758) was a French nobleman and soldier. He was born in Metz, Three Bishoprics, the only child of the Duke of Belle-Isle, a distinguished general, and his second wife Marie Casimire de Béthune. He was awarded the title Count of Gisors (comte de Gisors). He was admitted to the Knights Hospitaller as a child, but never took his vows because of his age, so allowing him to marry later.

== Military activities ==
At the age of 7, Fouquet was appointed colonel of the royal regiment of the province of Barrois on 1 November 1745. On 1 February 1749, Louis-Marie Fouquet was appointed colonel of the Champagne regiment. Louis Marie Fouquet de Belle-Isle was appointed governor of Metz and the country of Messin in 1756, after the death of his uncle.

During the Seven Years' War in the county of Nice, he distinguished himself at the Battle of Hastenbeck. Promoted to Mestre de camp, and then colonel, in 1758 Fouquet commanded the Royal-Carabiniers regiment at the battle of Krefeld, when he was mortally wounded during a charge. He died in Nuys shortly after. His death was reported in the Gazette de France. His funeral oration occurred at Metz Cathedral on 9 August 1758. His widow married Camille, Prince of Marsan in 1759.

== Marriage ==
On 23 May 1753, he married Princess Hélène Mancini, Mademoiselle de Nevers (1740–1780) eldest daughter of Louis Jules Mancini, 10th Duke of Nevers and a niece of Jean-Frédéric Phélypeaux, Count of Maurepas. They had no children.

== Arms ==
- D'argent à l'écureuil rampant de gueules
