= Maximilian Ulysses Browne =

Austrian field marshal (1705–1757)

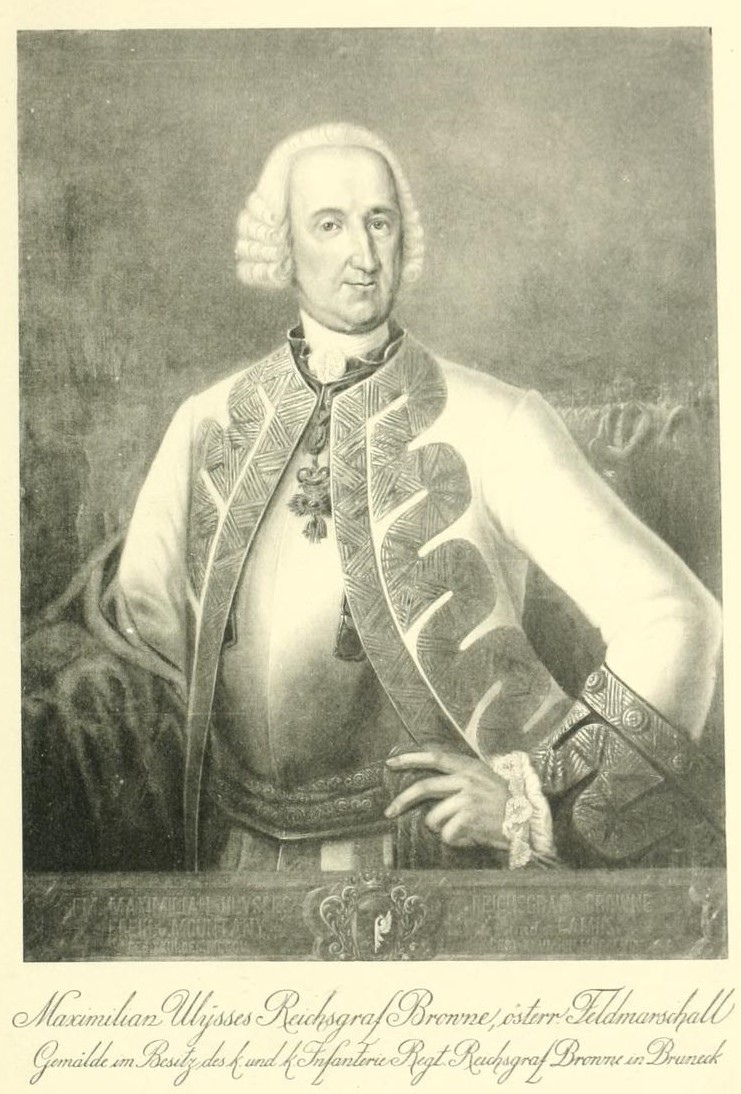
- Portrait, 18th century
- Born: 23 October 1705; Basel, Swiss Confederation
- Died: 26 June 1757 (aged 51); Prague, Kingdom of Bohemia
- Military career
- Allegiance: Holy Roman Empire
- Rank: Field marshal
- Conflicts: War of the Austrian Succession; Battle of Velletri; Battle of Vilshofen; Battle of Piacenza; Siege of Antibes; Third Silesian War; Siege of Pirna; Battle of Lobositz; Battle of Štěrboholy
- Awards: Order of the Golden Fleece

Maximilian Ulysses, Reichsgraf von Browne, Baron de Camus and Mountany (23 October 1705 – 26 June 1757) was an Austrian military officer, one of the highest-ranking officers serving the Habsburg Emperor during the middle of the 18th century. An Irish refugee, he was a scion of the Wild Geese.

== Background ==
Maximilian was born in Basel, Switzerland, the son of Count Ulysses von Browne (b. Limerick, Ireland; 1659 d. Frankfurt am Main 1731, second Earl of Browne in the Jacobite Peerage) and his wife Annabella Fitzgerald, a daughter of the House of Desmond. Both families had been exiled from Ireland in the aftermath of Tyrone's Rebellion.

== Early career ==
Browne's early career was helped by family and marital connections. His father and his father's brother, George (b. Limerick 1657 d. Pavia 1729, first Earl of Browne in the Jacobite Peerage), were created Counts of the Holy Roman Empire (Reichsgraf) by Emperor Charles VI in 1716 after serving with distinction in the service of the Holy Roman Emperors. The brothers enjoyed a lengthy, close friendship with John Churchill, 1st Duke of Marlborough, who was primarily responsible for their establishment in the Imperial Service of Austria. On his father's death in 1731, he became third Earl of Browne in the Jacobite Peerage. His wife, Countess Marie Philippine von Martinitz, had valuable connections at court and his sister, Barbara (b. Limerick 1700 d. Mantua 1751), was married to Freiherr (Baron) Francis Patrick O'Neillan (b. Dysert 1671 d. Mantua 1734) a Major General in the Austrian Service (See Dysert O'Dea Castle). So, by the age of 29 von Browne was already colonel of an Austrian infantry regiment.

But he justified his early promotion in the field, and in the Italian campaign of 1734 he greatly distinguished himself. In the Tirolese fighting of 1735, and in the Turkish war, he won further distinction as a general officer.

== War of the Austrian Succession ==
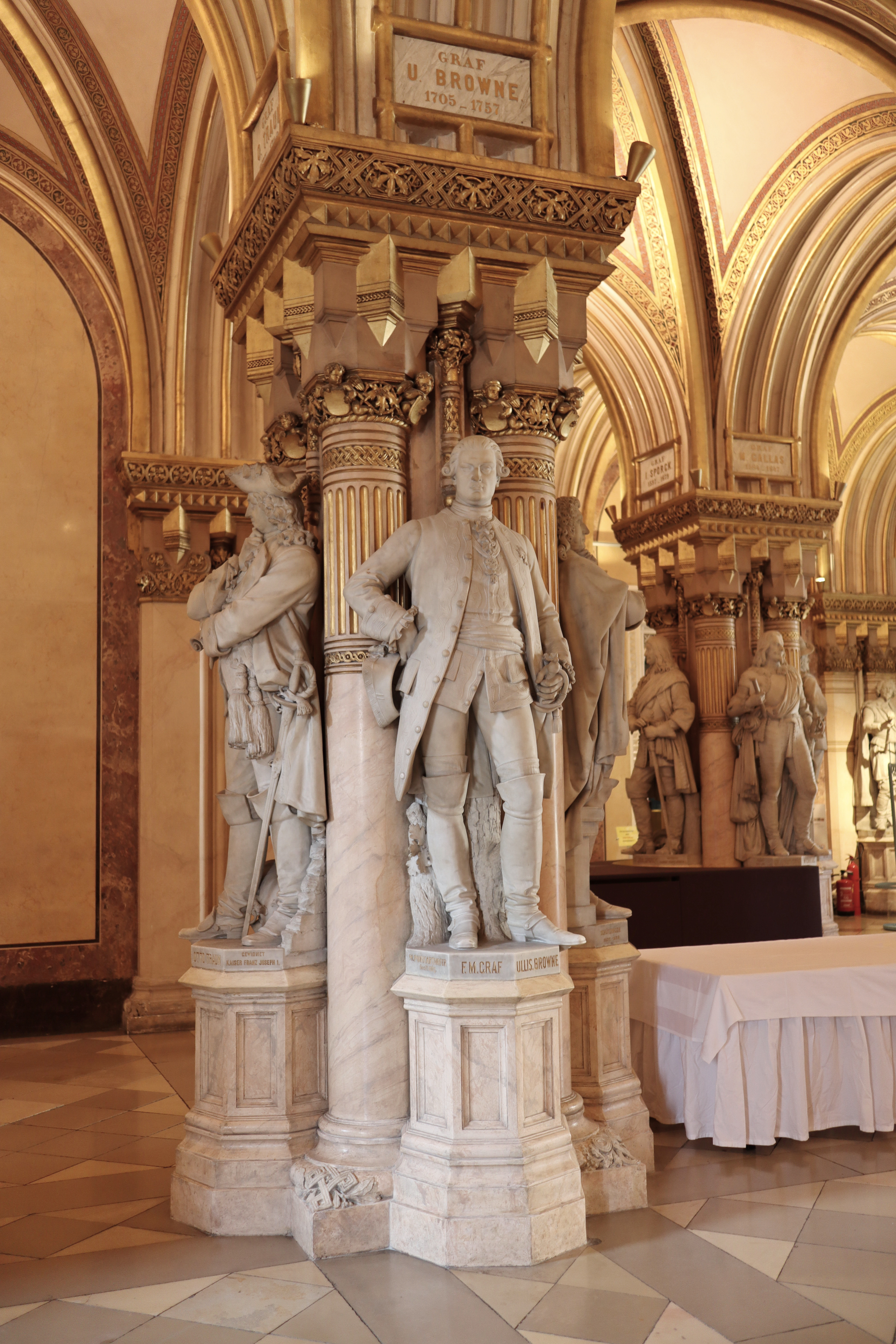
Statue of Maximilian Ulysses Browne in Museum of Military History, Vienna - Feldherrnhalle

He was a lieutenant field marshal in command of the Silesian garrisons when in 1740 Frederick II and the Prussian army overran the province. His careful employment of such resources as he possessed materially hindered the king in his conquest and gave time for Austria to collect a field army (see War of the Austrian Succession). He was present at Mollwitz, where he received a severe wound. His vehement opposition to all half-hearted measures brought him frequently into conflict with his superiors, but contributed materially to the unusual energy displayed by the Austrian armies in 1742 and 1743.

In the following campaigns von Browne exhibited the same qualities of generalship and the same impatience of control. In 1745 he served under Count Traun, and was promoted to the rank of Feldzeugmeister. In 1746 he was present in the Italian campaign and the battles of Piacenza and Rottofreddo. Von Browne himself with the advanced guard forced his way across the Apennines and entered Genoa. He was thereafter placed in command of the invasion of France mounted in winter 1746–7, leading to the Siege of Antibes, but he was obliged to break off the invasion and return to Italy in February 1747 after Genoa rose in rebellion against the Austrian garrison he had left behind. In early 1747 he was appointed commander of all imperial forces in Italy, replacing Antoniotto Botta Adorno. At the end of the war, von Browne was engaged in the negotiations on troop withdrawals from Italy, which led to the convention of Nice (21 January 1749). He became commander-in-chief in Bohemia in 1751, and field marshal (Generalfeldmarschall) two years later.

== Seven Years' War ==
He was still in Bohemia when the Seven Years' War opened with Frederick's invasion of Saxony (1756). Von Browne's army, advancing to the relief of Pirna, was met, and, after a hard struggle, defeated by the king at Lobositz, but he drew off in excellent order, and soon made another attempt with a picked force to reach Pirna, by wild mountain tracks. The field marshal never spared himself, bivouacking in the snow with his men, and Carlyle records that private soldiers made rough shelters over him as he slept.

He actually reached the Elbe at Schandau, but as the Saxons were unable to break out, von Browne retired, having succeeded, however, in delaying the development of Frederick's operations for a whole campaign. In the campaign of 1757, he voluntarily served under Prince Charles Alexander of Lorraine who was made commander-in-chief, and on 6 May in that year, while leading a bayonet charge at the Battle of Prague, von Browne, like Schwerin on the same day, met his death. He was carried mortally wounded into Prague, and there died on 26 June.

== Family ==
He had two sons, Philip George (1727–1803) and Joseph Ulysses (1728–1758). His younger son, Joseph, succeeded to the proprietorship of his regiment, but was killed at the Battle of Hochkirch in 1758. His elder son, Philip, became a lieutenant-general and a founder member of the military order of Maria Theresa. The last of his line died childless in 1803. Philip was the fourth Earl of Browne in the Jacobite Peerage.

== Honors ==
From 1888 to 1918, an Austrian army regiment was named Infantrie Regiment Browne Nr. 36 (i.e. "36th (Browne) Infantry Regiment"), after Maximilian von Browne.

Military offices
| Preceded by Franz Paul von Wallis | Proprietor (Inhaber) of Infantry Regiment N°36; 1737–1757 | Succeeded by Joseph Browne |

== See also ==
- Irish military diaspora
- Irish regiments

== Sources ==
- "Броун, Максимилиан-Улисс" . Brockhaus and Efron Encyclopedic Dictionary (in Russian). 1906.
- Zuverläßige Lebens-Beschreibung des verstorbenen kaiserl. königl. General-Feldmarschals, Ulyßes Maximilian, des heil. röm. Reichs Grafen von Browne. Frankfurt and Leipzig, 1757 (digitized copy).
- Baron O'Cahill, ‘Militairische Geschichte des K. K. General-Feldmarschalls Grafen von Browne’, Geschichte der Grösten Heerführer neuerer Zeiten gesammelt und mit taktisch-geographischen Noten begleitet. Zweyter Theil. Rastadt: Johann Wolfgang Dorner, 1785, pp. 264–317 (digitized copy).
- Chichester, Henry Manners (1886). "Brown, Ulysses Maximilian von" . In Stephen, Leslie (ed.). Dictionary of National Biography. Vol. 7. London: Smith, Elder & Co.
- Gilman, D. C.; Peck, H. T.; Colby, F. M., eds. (1905). "Browne, Maximilian Ulysses" . New International Encyclopedia (1st ed.). New York: Dodd, Mead.
- Austro-Hungarian Army (1851). "Militär-Schematismus des österreichischen Kaiserthums: Regiment Nr. 36". Vienna: Imperial and Royal Austro-Hungarian Army. p. 243.
- Stefan Michael Newerkla, "Die irischen Reichsgrafen von Browne-Camus in russischen und österreichischen Diensten. Vom Vertrag von Limerick (1691) bis zum Tod ihres Hausfreunds Ludwig van Beethoven (1827)" [The Irish Imperial Counts of Browne-Camus in Russian and Austrian Service. From the Treaty of Limerick (1691) to the Death of their House Friend Ludwig van Beethoven (1827)]. In: Lazar Fleishman, Stefan Michael Newerkla & Michael Wachtel (eds.), Скрещения судеб. Literarische und kulturelle Beziehungen zwischen Russland und dem Westen. A Festschrift for Fedor B. Poljakov (= Stanford Slavic Studies, Volume 49). Berlin: Peter Lang, 2019. ISBN 978-3-631-78385-6, pp. 43–68, here pp. 47–50.
