= Siege of Antibes =

1746–1747 siege

- Part of War of the Austrian Succession
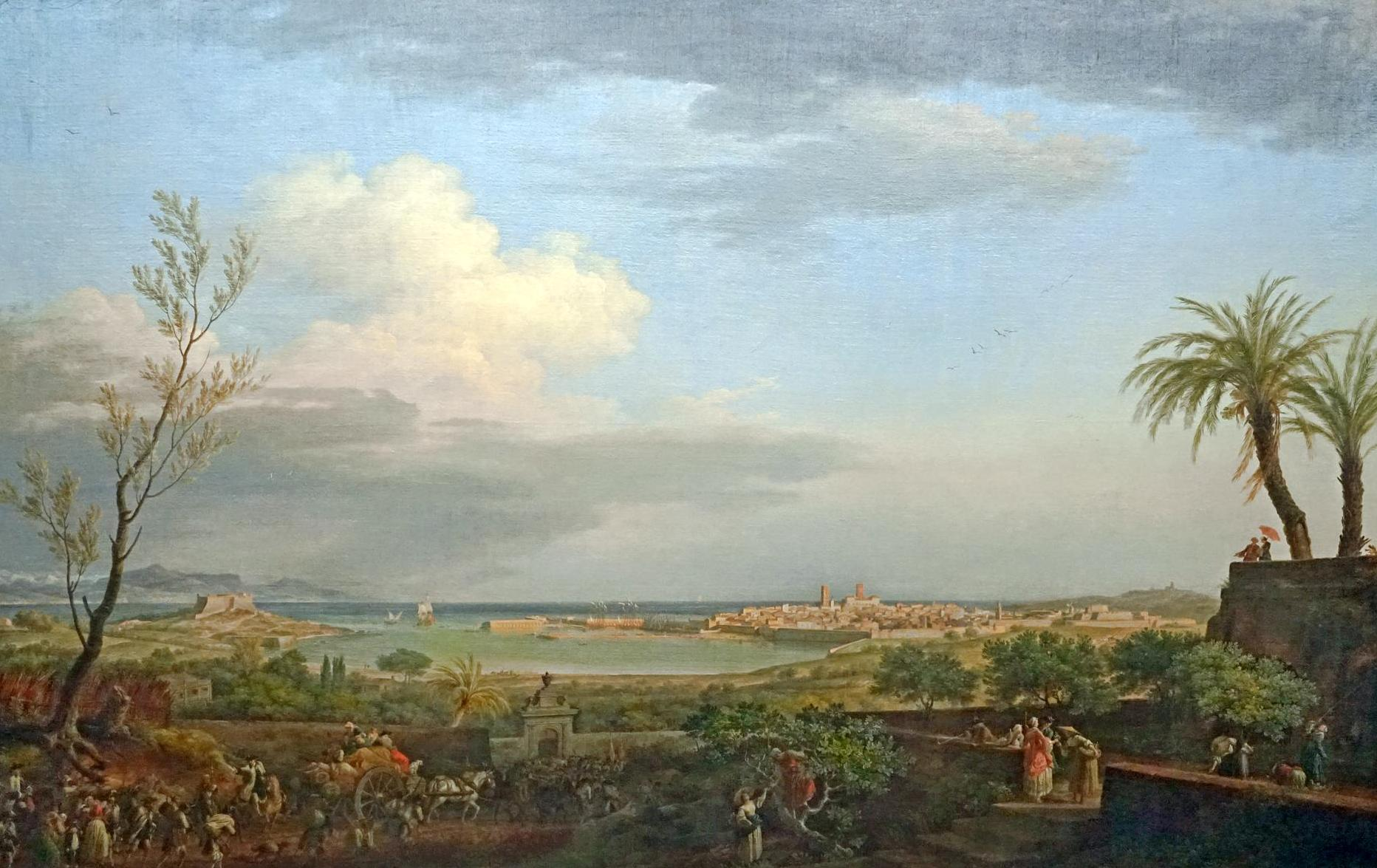
- Antibes in 1756
Date	5 December 1746 – 1 February 1747 (57 days)
Location	Antibes, Kingdom of France 43.58°N 7.124°E
Result	French victory; Allied invasion of France repulsed

Belligerents
Austria (Kingdom of Sardinia) Sardinia; Great Britain	France

Commanders and leaders
(Habsburg monarchy) Maximilian Ulysses Browne (Kingdom of Great Britain) John Byng	(Kingdom of France) Joseph-David, Count of Sade (Kingdom of France) Chevalier de Belle-Isle

The siege of Antibes took place in the winter of 1746–47, during the War of the Austrian Succession. A combined Austro-Savoyard army, commanded by Maximilian Ulysses Browne, invaded France and laid siege to Antibes on the French Mediterranean coast. Despite having British naval support, the Allies failed to capture the town, and after two months Browne's army was forced to lift the siege and retreat back over the border into Savoy.

== Background ==
Earlier in the war the French had invaded Italy, attacking Savoy and the Austrian Duchy of Milan, but they were forced to retreat after the indecisive Battle of Rottofreddo (10 August 1746). The Allies then went on the offensive, their first target being France's ally the Republic of Genoa. The Republic was successfully defeated and occupied after the Siege of Genoa (1746), and the Allies subsequently drew up plans to invade France itself. Command of the operation was entrusted to the Austrian general Maximilian Ulysses Browne.

== Prelude ==
On 30 November, Browne led his Austro-Savoyard army over the River Var into France and encamped at Cagnes-sur-Mer. From here he had the option of pressing on westward, but before doing so he wished to take control of the fortified town of Antibes, which was situated on a promontory 10 kilometres to the south and had the potential to disrupt his communications with Italy if left in enemy hands. He therefore sent an envoy to offer surrender terms to the town on 4 December, but these were refused by the commandant, Joseph-David, Count of Sade, and so Browne broke camp and marched south to besiege Antibes.

== Siege ==
The siege began on 5 December, and at 4 AM on the following day the Allies attempted to capture the town by storm, but the night attack was repulsed. Browne therefore brought up his artillery, which entrenched themselves at Golfe-Juan and from there began bombarding Antibes. During the week of 19–25 December the town was also subject to a naval bombardment by a British squadron commanded by John Byng.

Browne again offered terms on 26 December, but de Sade once more rejected them, supposedly responding with the celebrated words:

Sa Majesté m'ayant fait l'honneur de me confier cette place, je préfère infiniment, au deshonneur de la rendre, la gloire d'être enseveli sous ses ruines.
His Majesty having done me the honour of entrusting me with this place, I would infinitely prefer the glory of being buried under its ruins to the dishonour of surrendering it.

Two days later, on 28 December, Browne made another attempt to seize the town directly, this time concentrating the attack on Fort Carré and deploying his Croatian shock troops to lead the assault, but again the besiegers were repulsed. The Austrians were therefore forced to revert to their previous strategy of bombarding Antibes into submission.

The siege dragged on into the new year, but by this point the Allies had received the disturbing news that the garrison they had left behind in Genoa had been expelled by a rebellion on 6 December. The Genoese resurgence imperiled the army's lines of communication from Italy and threw the invasion of France into jeopardy. Browne prevaricated for a few weeks, but his mind was made up for him on 1 February 1747, when the Antibes garrison was reinforced by sea with troops commanded by the Chevalier de Belle-Isle. The arrival of these reinforcements dashed the last hopes of capturing Antibes, and so on the same day the Allies lifted the siege and began the retreat to Italy. A Second Siege of Genoa followed later in the year.

By the time the Austrians withdrew, their artillery had fired 2600 bombs and 200 firepots into Antibes, levelling 350 houses and also gutting Antibes Cathedral, though the latter was subsequently rebuilt.

== Sources ==
- Tisserand, Eugène (1876). Petite Histoire d'Antibes des Origines à la Révolution. Éditions des Régionalismes. pp. 302–8. ISBN 978-2-8240-0609-3.
- Carli, Félicien (December 2017). Antibes: A Short History of Architecture. Éditions du Cardo. p. 17. ISBN 978-2-37786-006-7.
- "Antibes Juan-les-Pins, a rich history". Antibes Juan-les-Pins. 28 January 2019.
