= Louis Charles Armand Fouquet, Chevalier de Belle-Isle =

French general and diplomat

Louis Charles Armand Fouquet
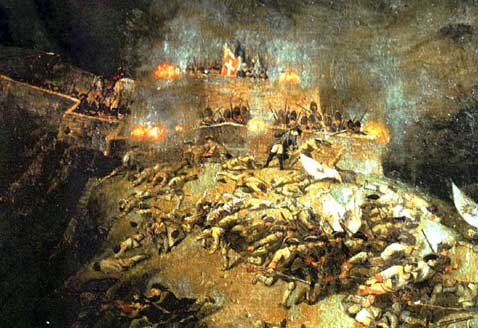
- The death of the Chevalier de Belle-Isle.
- Born: 19 September 1693; Agde, Languedoc, Kingdom of France
- Died: 19 July 1747 (aged 53); Colle dell'Assietta, Sardinia
- Relatives: Charles Louis Auguste Fouquet, duc de Belle-Isle (brother)
- Military career
- Allegiance: Kingdom of France
- Branch: French Royal Army
- Service years: 1707–1747
- Rank: Lieutenant général des armées
- Commands: Army of Piedmont
- Conflicts: War of the Spanish Succession; War of the Polish Succession; War of the Austrian Succession: Siege of Antibes; Battle of Assietta †
- Awards: Order of Saint Louis
- Other work: diplomat

Louis Charles Armand Fouquet
- Chevalier de Belle-Isle
- Full name: Louis Charles Armand Fouquet
- Born: 19 September 1693; Agde, France
- Died: 19 July 1747 (aged 53); Colle dell'Assietta, Sardinia
- Spouse: never married
- Issue: no issue
- Father: Louis Fouquet, Marquis of Belle-Isle
- Mother: Catherine Agnès de Lévis

Louis Charles Armand Fouquet, known as Chevalier de Belle-Isle (French: [lwi ʃaʁl aʁmɑ̃ fukɛ]; 19 September 1693 in Agde – 19 July 1747 at the Battle of Assietta), was a French general and diplomat. He was the younger brother to Marshal Charles Louis Auguste Fouquet, duc de Belle-Isle.

He served as a junior officer in the War of the Spanish Succession and as brigadier in the campaign of 1734 on the Rhine and Moselle, where he won the grade of Maréchal de camp. He was employed under his brother in political missions in Bavaria and in Swabia in 1741–1742, became a lieutenant-general, fought in Bohemia, Bavaria and the Rhine countries in 1742–1743, and was arrested and sent to England with the marshal in 1744. On his release he was given a command in the Army of Piedmont, and troops under his command reinforced the beleaguered city of Antibes during the 1746-7 siege, preventing its fall to the Austrians. Belle-Isle ultimately was killed at the Battle of Assietta on 19 July 1747.
