= Giovanni di Bricherasio =

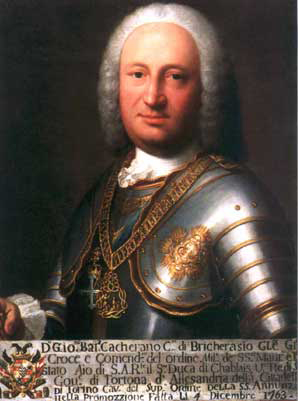
Giovanni Battista Cacherano, Count of Bricherasio

Giovanni Battista Cacherano, conte di Bricherasio (14 November 1706 – 6 September 1782) was a general and viceroy of Sardinia.

== Life ==
Count Giovanni Battista Cacherano di Bricherasio came from an old Piedmontese noble family that produced numerous high-ranking officers. Three of his brothers also pursued officer careers in the Piedmontese Army.

In April 1734 he raised the Infantry Regiment "La Regina" today the 9th Infantry Regiment "Bari" at his own expense, which at that time still consisted of Waldensians. With this regiment he took part in the War of the Polish Succession in Italy. During the War of the Austrian Succession he took part in the capture of Modena in 1742, then fought in the Valle Varaita and at Madonna dell'Olmo, where he was wounded. In 1744 Cacherano di Bricherasio was promoted to Brigadier, the following year to Major General and in June 1747 to Lieutenant General. As such, he commanded units that were supposed to protect the Susa Valley with the fortresses of Fenestrelle and Exilles against the advance of the French and Spanish armies. Here, on 19 July 1747, the Battle of Assietta took place, which remained his greatest military success. In 1751 he was appointed Viceroy and Captain General of Sardinia, in 1755 Governor of Tortona, in 1758 Governor of Alessandria and finally in 1763 Governor of the Citadel of Turin. In 1763 he received the Order of the Annunciation. He was promoted to General of the Infantry and Grand Master of the Artillery in 1771. He spent the last years of his life on his estates in Bricherasio, where he died in 1782.
