= Battle of Štěrboholy =

Part of the Third Silesian War

Battle of Prague
- Part of the Third Silesian War (Seven Years' War)
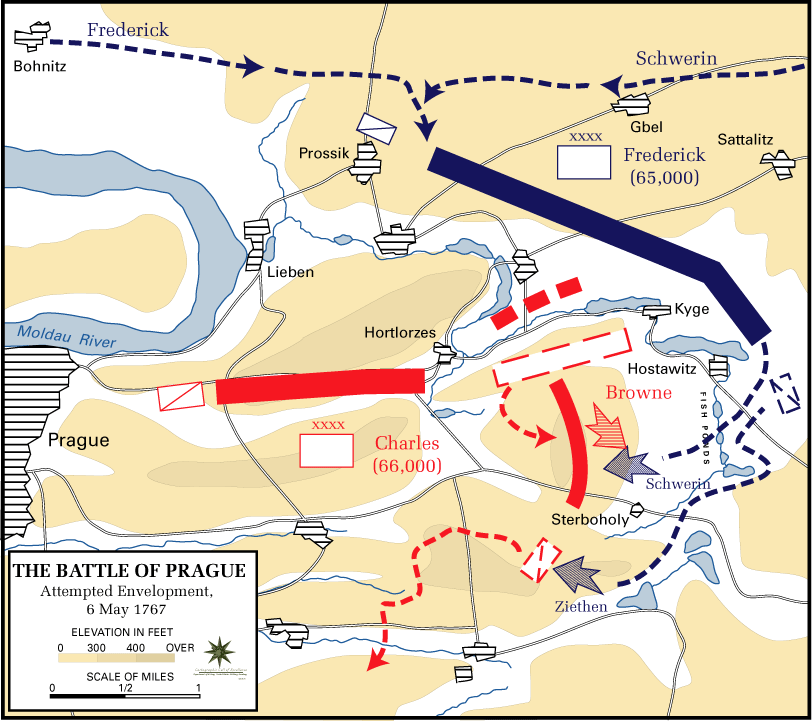
Date	6 May 1757
Location	Prague, Štěrboholy, Bohemia, present-day Czech Republic 50°05′N 14°33′E
Result	Prussian victory

Belligerents
(Kingdom of Prussia) Prussia	(Habsburg monarchy) Austria

Commanders and leaders
(Kingdom of Prussia) Frederick the Great (Kingdom of Prussia) Prince Henry of Prussia (Kingdom of Prussia) Kurt Christoph Graf von Schwerin †	(Holy Roman Empire) Charles of Lorraine (Holy Roman Empire) Maximilian Ulysses Count Browne (DOW)

Strength
64,000	60,000–61,000

Casualties and losses
14,300 killed and wounded	13,275

Frederick the Great
current battle
First Silesian War
Second Silesian War
Third Silesian War

The Battle of Prague, also known as Battle of Štěrboholy, was fought on 6 May 1757, during the Third Silesian War and the broader Seven Years' War, between the Kingdom of Prussia and Habsburg Austria. Although Frederick the Great's army of 64,000 Prussians forced 60,000 Austrians to retreat, he lost 14,300 men and decided he was not strong enough to attack Prague.

The battle is mentioned in the famous German ballad Lenore written in 1773 by Gottfried August Bürger.

== Prelude ==
After Frederick had forced the surrender of Saxony in the 1756 campaign, he spent the winter devising new plans for a defence of his small kingdom. It was not in his nature, nor in his military strategy, simply to sit back and defend. He began drawing up plans for another bold strike against Austria.

In early spring the Prussian army marched in four columns over the mountain passes separating Saxony and Silesia from Bohemia. The four corps would unite at the Bohemian capital of Prague. Though risky, because it exposed the Prussian army to a defeat in detail, the plan succeeded. After Frederick's corps united with a corps under Prince Moritz, and General Bevern joined up with Schwerin, both armies converged near Prague.

Meanwhile, the Austrians had not been idle. Though initially surprised by the early Prussian attack, the able Austrian field marshal Maximilian Ulysses Count Browne had been retreating skillfully and concentrating his armed forces towards Prague. Here he established a fortified position to the east of the town, and an additional army under Prince Charles of Lorraine arrived, swelling the Austrian numbers to 60,000. The prince now took command.

The Austrian army under von Browne had taken up a near invincible position on the Ziska- and the Tabor mountains. The town was on their left flank, with a steep gorge to the north, and to the west by a marshy slope with a brook at the bottom. The two Austrian commanders were in disagreement about the course of action: von Browne wanted to attack, but Charles decided to wait for Konigseck, who had been defeated at the Battle of Reichenberg but was known to be retreating towards Prague, and possibly even for the arrival of Daun.

On 6 May, around 5 am, the Prussian army assembled to the north on the Prosek heights, 115,000 men strong, and Frederick sent Keith with 30,000 to the west of the town to cut off any Austrian retreat. The Austrians drew up for battle facing north and east.

== Battle ==
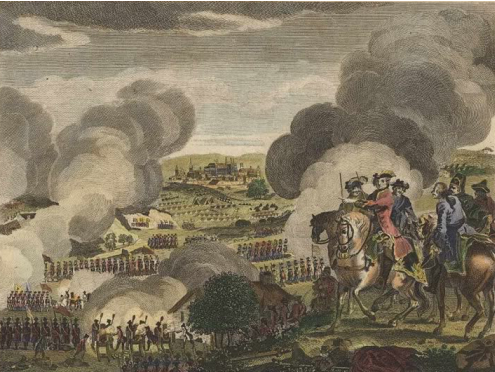
The Battle of Prague in Bohemia, May 6, 1757, English 18th century copper engraving

Frederick ordered an immediate assault, but Schwerin convinced him to make a reconnaissance around the Austrian right flank. He returned with the information that gradually sloping green meadows offered a better chance for attack at the Austrian rear. The Prussian army started marching around 7 am, and succeeded in staying largely out of sight till the Austrian generals noticed the movements around 10 am. Field Marshal von Browne shifted six infantry regiments to take up position to the south east.

Schwerin, accompanied by General Winterfeldt, was finally prepared to attack. The attack was led by the infantry of Winterfeldt. The Prussian infantry soon found themselves not in meadows, but in the remains of fish ponds. While they struggled through, Winterfeldt was hit by a musketball. The Prussian infantry wavered and Schwerin rallied them, leading them from the front. He was hit several times by Austrian canister. Frederick, when he heard the news, ordered the assault to continue. Field Marshal Schwerin's death, however, had such an impact on King Frederick that eyewitness testimony, given by Count von Kalckreuth, indicates he suffered a nervous breakdown, appearing in a pitiful state before Prince Henry and Kalckreuth while lamenting the casualties suffered and barely being able to speak.

The Austrian infantry smelled the Prussian confusion and started to press the Prussians back down the slope, opening a gap between themselves and the remainder of the Austrian line still facing north. At this time von Browne was mortally wounded by Prussian infantry fire and carried into Prague.

While King Frederick and General von Zieten reorganised the Prussian infantry in the south for another attack, the generals Hautcharmoy and Bevern spotted the gap in the Austrian line and started to filter infantry into the gap. Austrian Croats had engaged Prussians to the north of the Austrian left flank, but with the gap in the Austrian line being exploited by a steady stream of Prussians he pulled back and formed a new line running south from the west end of the Tabor mountain.

The final phase of the battle started around 3 pm, with Prussians engaging the still-forming Austrian line and outflanking them from the south. Charles withdrew into the town, the retreat being covered by his cavalry.

King Frederick's exact whereabouts throughout the battle are, however, a matter of debate. The few recorded sightings of the King indicate he spent virtually the entire battle on the southern part of the field. By King Frederick's own account, he claimed to have fallen ill with stomach pains as a means of explaining his frequent absences and seemingly deferred to Schwerin both on matters of reconnaissance and when the field marshal urged the necessity of an expedient attack at Sterbohol, a crucial village in the immediate vicinity of Prague, at the very onset of the battle. As such, Schwerin's leadership and the independent initiative of regimental commanders following the field marshal's untimely demise should be hailed as chiefly contributing to the battle's victorious conclusion.

== Aftermath ==
The Prussian victory was at a high cost; Frederick lost over 14,000 men, and two of his best generals were out of action (Schwerin was killed by enemy fire and Winterfeldt was severely wounded). Prince Charles had also suffered heavily, losing 8,900 men killed or wounded and 4,500 prisoners. Given the high casualties he had suffered, Frederick decided to lay siege rather than launch a direct assault on the walls of Prague. He calculated that 40,000 soldiers, in addition to 75,000 inhabitants, would soon consume the city stores.

His calculation, however, did not take into account the relief army Austria managed to field against him at the Battle of Kolín, and he was soon forced to abandon the siege.
