= Battle of Vilshofen =

1745 battle between France and Austria

- Part of the War of the Austrian Succession
Date	28 March 1745
Location	Vilshofen an der Donau, present day Lower Bavaria
Result	Austrian victory

Belligerents
Austria	France (Electorate of Bavaria) Bavaria with Hessian support

Commanders and leaders
(Habsburg monarchy) Maximilian Ulysses Browne (WIA)	Unknown

Strength
Unknown	4,000–6,000

Casualties and losses
Unknown, likely low	3,000 butchered, up to 6,000 killed or wounded

The Battle of Vilshofen was fought on 28 March 1745 between France and Austria. The Austrians won the battle, before plundering Vilshofen.

Before the battle, a sizeable number of Bavarians and Hessians, likely numbering around 4,000–6,000 men, curbed Austrian advances for five days. On 28 March 1745, Austrian general Maximilian Ulysses Browne led troops into Vilshofen. As the mostly Croatian troops entered the city, they began to plunder and loot the city, burning it to the ground. 3,000 of the Hessian defenders were butchered. Browne was wounded by his own men while trying to stop the frenzy. Following the battle, Browne recovered from his wounds in Passau. Up to 6,000 of the Hessians may have died in the Battle of Vilshofen.
