= Fragrance extraction =

Obtaining fragrant oils and compounds from raw materials

Thousands of tons of the essential oil limonene are produced by expression (squeezing) of orange peels

Fragrance extraction refers to the separation process of aromatic compounds from raw materials, using methods such as distillation, solvent extraction, expression. Extraction is an early stage in an industry that produces ca. 100,000 tons of product annually (2015).

Techniques for extraction are governed by their efficiency, cost, and their ability to not alter the essential oil. Heat, chemical solvents, or exposure to oxygen in the extraction process may denature some aromatic compounds, either changing their odour character or rendering them odourless, and the proportion of each aromatic component that is extracted can differ.

== Solvent extraction ==
Organic solvent extraction is a common and economically important technique for extracting aromatics. Plant materials are submerged and agitated in a solvent that can dissolve the desired aromatic compounds. Often the plant material is subjected to maceration prior to extraction. Diverse solvents are used.

=== Hydrocarbon extraction ===
Hydrocarbons such as hexane, toluene, and dimethyl ether extract hydrophobic substances such as wax, fats, pigments as well as essential oils. The extract is subjected to vacuum processing, which removes the solvent for re-use. The process can last anywhere from hours to months. Fragrant compounds for woody and fibrous plant materials are often obtained in this matter as are all aromatics from animal sources. The technique can also be used to extract odorants that are too volatile for distillation or easily denatured by heat. The remaining waxy mass is known as a concrete.

Although highly fragrant, concretes are too viscous – even solid – at room temperature to be useful. This is due to the presence of high-molecular-weight, non-fragrant waxes and resins. Another solvent, often ethyl alcohol, which only dissolves the fragrant low-molecular weight compounds, must be used to extract the fragrant oil from the concrete. The alcohol is removed by a second distillation, leaving behind the absolute. These extracts from plants such as jasmine and rose, are called absolutes.

Due to the low temperatures in this process, the absolute may be more faithful to the original scent of the raw material, which is subjected to high heat during the distillation process.

Hexane-based extraction has also been used with microwave heating.

=== Supercritical fluid extraction ===
supercritical CO_{2} extraction is a technique for extracting fragrant compounds from a raw material. The extracting medium is a supercritical fluid forms. Since CO_{2} is a non-polar compound, it has low surface tension and wets easily, and can be used to extract the typically hydrophobic aromatics from the plant material, such as decaffeinating coffee beans and tea leaves or compounds from hops.

Extraction takes place at a low temperature (ca. 30 °C), which is gentle compared to steam distillation. The method is usually more efficient in terms of the yield of compound extracted. Since CO_{2} is gas at normal atmospheric pressure, it also leaves no trace of itself in the final product, thus allowing one to derive the absolute extract directly. It is a low-temperature process, and the solvents are easily removed. Extracts produced using this process are sometimes known as CO_{2} extracts. A challenge with the technique is its cost.

=== Ethanol extraction ===
Ethanol extraction is a type of solvent extraction used to extract fragrant compounds directly from dry raw materials, as well as the impure oils or concrete resulting from organic solvent extraction, expression, or enfleurage. Ethanol extracts from dry materials are called tinctures, while ethanol washes for purifying oils and concretes are called absolutes.

Since ethanol is less hydrophobic than hydrocarbon solvents, it dissolves polar constituents, leaving behind the wax, fats, and other generally hydrophobic substances. The alcohol is evaporated under low-pressure, leaving behind absolute. The absolute may be further processed.

Ethanol extraction is not typically used to extract fragrance from fresh plant materials; these contain large quantities of water, which will be extracted into the ethanol, although this is sometimes not a concern.

=== Enfleurage ===
In enfleurage, odorless tallow or lard is the extracting agent. The plant is immersed in the fat, which absorbs the essential oils. After extraction of many batches of plants, the fat becomes saturated with the oils. The essential oils are then extracted from the fat with a second liquid solvent. Enfleurage is obsolete but was practiced in the early days of the fragrance industry.

== Steam distillation ==
Steam distillation is the dominant method for isolation of essential oils and associated materials. Several nuances to the technique are recognized: water distillation, water/steam distillation, and steam distillation. Classically, steam is passed through a container of the raw material, sometimes for hours, which drives out most of their volatile fragrant compounds. The condensate from distillation consists of both water and the aromatics, which are easily separated. Thus, two products result: the refined essential oil and an aqueous solution or hydrosol.

Major essential oils obtained by steam distillation are peppermint oil, clove oil, eucalyptus oil, nutmeg oil, and sassafras oil. Most oils are steam distilled in a single process. The process can be slow, illustrated by Ylang-ylang (Cananga odorata), which takes 22 hours to complete distillation. It is fractionally distilled, producing several grades (Ylang-Ylang "extra", I, II, III and "complete", in which the distillation is run from start to finish with no interruption).

The water collected from the condensate, which retains some of the fragrant compounds and oils from the raw material, is called hydrosol. It is sometimes sold for consumer and commercial use. This method is most commonly used for fresh plant materials such as flowers, leaves, and stems. Popular hydrosols are rose water, lavender water, and orange flower water.

Microwave heating can be coupled to steam distillation.

=== Other distillation techniques ===
In principle fractional distillation or ordinary distillation is used to manipulate the properties of partially purified essential oils. For example, phytotoxic furanocoumarin contaminants in bergamot oils are removed by distillation. Otherwise the oil is unsuited for used as a cosmetic.

=== Dry/destructive distillation ===
Also known as rectification, the raw materials are directly heated in a still without a carrier solvent such as water. Fragrant compounds that are released from the raw material by the high heat often undergo anhydrous pyrolysis, which results in the formation of different fragrant compounds, and thus different fragrant notes. This method is used to obtain fragrant compounds from fossil amber and fragrant woods (such as birch tar) where an intentional "burned" or "toasted" odour is desired.

== Expression ==
Various essential oil products extracted from components of an orange tree (image adapted from Techniques for Oil Extraction)

Expression as a mechanical method of fragrance extraction: raw materials are pressed, squeezed or compressed in a machine and the essential oils are collected. It is the dominant method for obtaining oils from citrus family. The principal product is citrus peel oil associated with the orange juice industry. bergamot oil, grapefruit oil, lemon oil, are also produced by expression. On the other hand, lime oil is usually obtained by steam distillation. Citrus peel oils are expressed mechanically, or cold-pressed. Due to the large quantities of oil in citrus peel and the relatively low cost to grow and harvest the raw materials, citrus-fruit oils are cheaper than most other essential oils. In fact, limonene extracted from these fruit is available as an affordable naturally-derived solvent. Lemon or sweet orange oils that are obtained as by-products of the commercial citrus industry are among the cheapest citrus oils.

Expression was mainly used prior to the discovery of distillation, and this is still the case in cultures such as Egypt. Traditional Egyptian practice involves pressing the plant material, then burying it in unglazed ceramic vessels in the desert for a period of months to drive out water. The water has a smaller molecular size, so it diffuses through the ceramic vessels, while the larger essential oils do not. The lotus oil in Tutankhamen's tomb, which retained its scent after 3000 years sealed in alabaster vessels, was pressed in this manner.

== See also ==
- Perfume
- Rose oil
- Clove oil
