= Grasse =

Subprefecture of Alpes-Maritimes, Provence-Alpes-Côte d'Azur, France

Grasse Grassa (Occitan)
- Subprefecture and commune
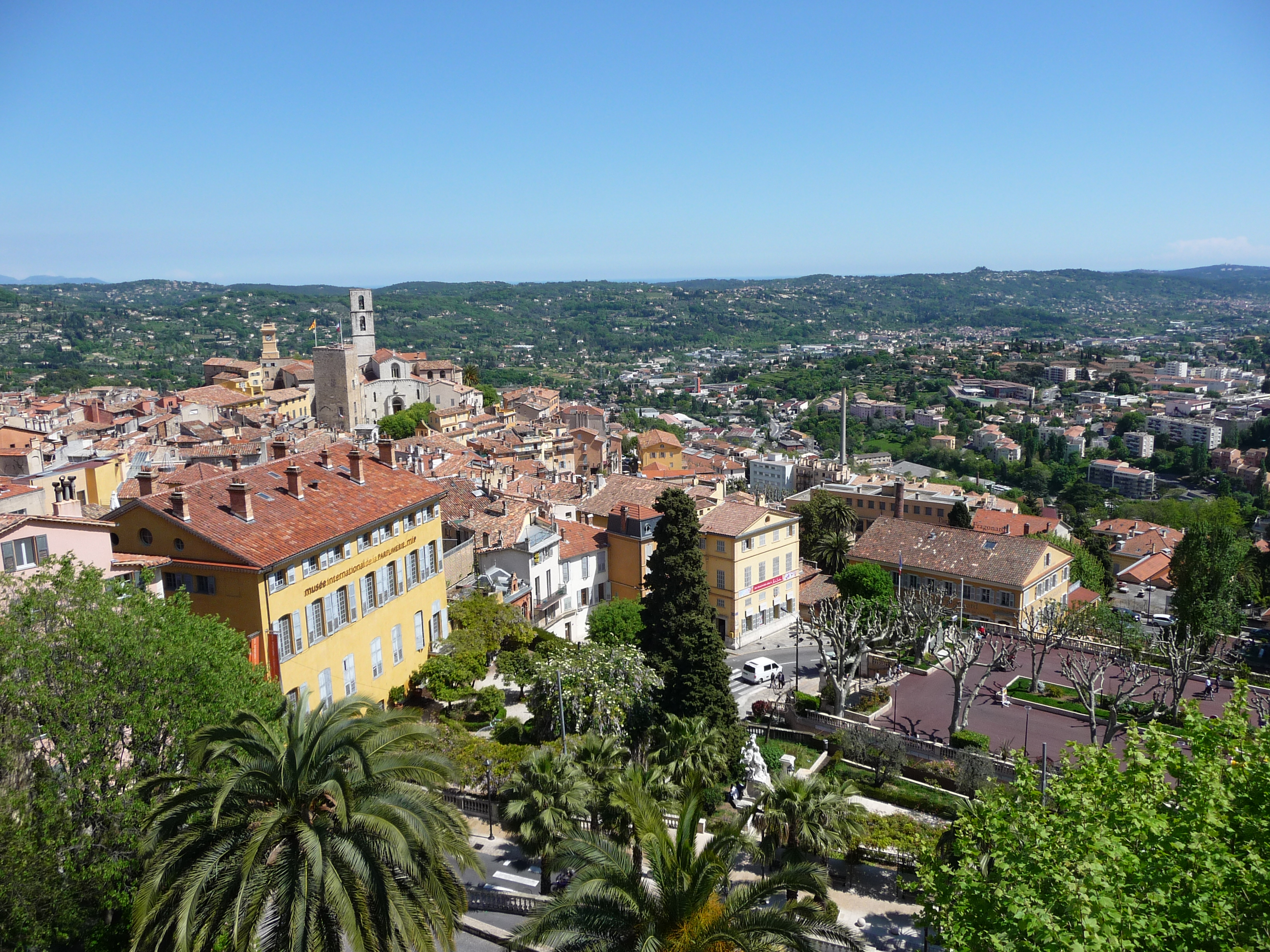
- A view of Grasse

- Coat of arms
- Location of Grasse
- Location within France Location within Provence-Alpes-Côte d'Azur
- Coordinates: 43°40′00″N 6°55′00″E
- Country: France
- Region: Provence-Alpes-Côte d'Azur
- Department: Alpes-Maritimes
- Arrondissement: Grasse
- Canton: Grasse-1 and 2
- Intercommunality: CA Pays de Grasse

Government
  - Mayor (2026–32): Jérôme Viaud (LR)
- Area^{1}: 44.44 km^{2} (17.16 sq mi)
- Elevation: 333 m (1,093 ft)
- Highest elevation: 1,061 m (3,481 ft)
- Lowest elevation: 80 m (260 ft)
- Population (2023): 50,970
  - Density: 1,147/km^{2} (2,971/sq mi)
- Time zone: UTC+01:00 (CET)
  - Summer (DST): UTC+02:00 (CEST)
- INSEE/Postal code: 06069 /06130
- ^{1} French Land Register data, which excludes lakes, ponds, glaciers > 1 km^{2} (0.386 sq mi or 247 acres) and river estuaries.

Grasse (French pronunciation: [ɡʁas]; Provençal Occitan: Grassa _{in classical norm} or Grasso _{in Mistralian norm} [ˈɡɾasɔ]; traditional Italian: Grassa) is the only subprefecture of the Alpes-Maritimes department in the Provence-Alpes-Côte-d'Azur region on the French Riviera.

Considered the world's capital of perfume, Grasse obtained two flowers in the Concours des villes et villages fleuris and was made Ville d'Art et d'Histoire (City of Art and History).

== Perfume ==
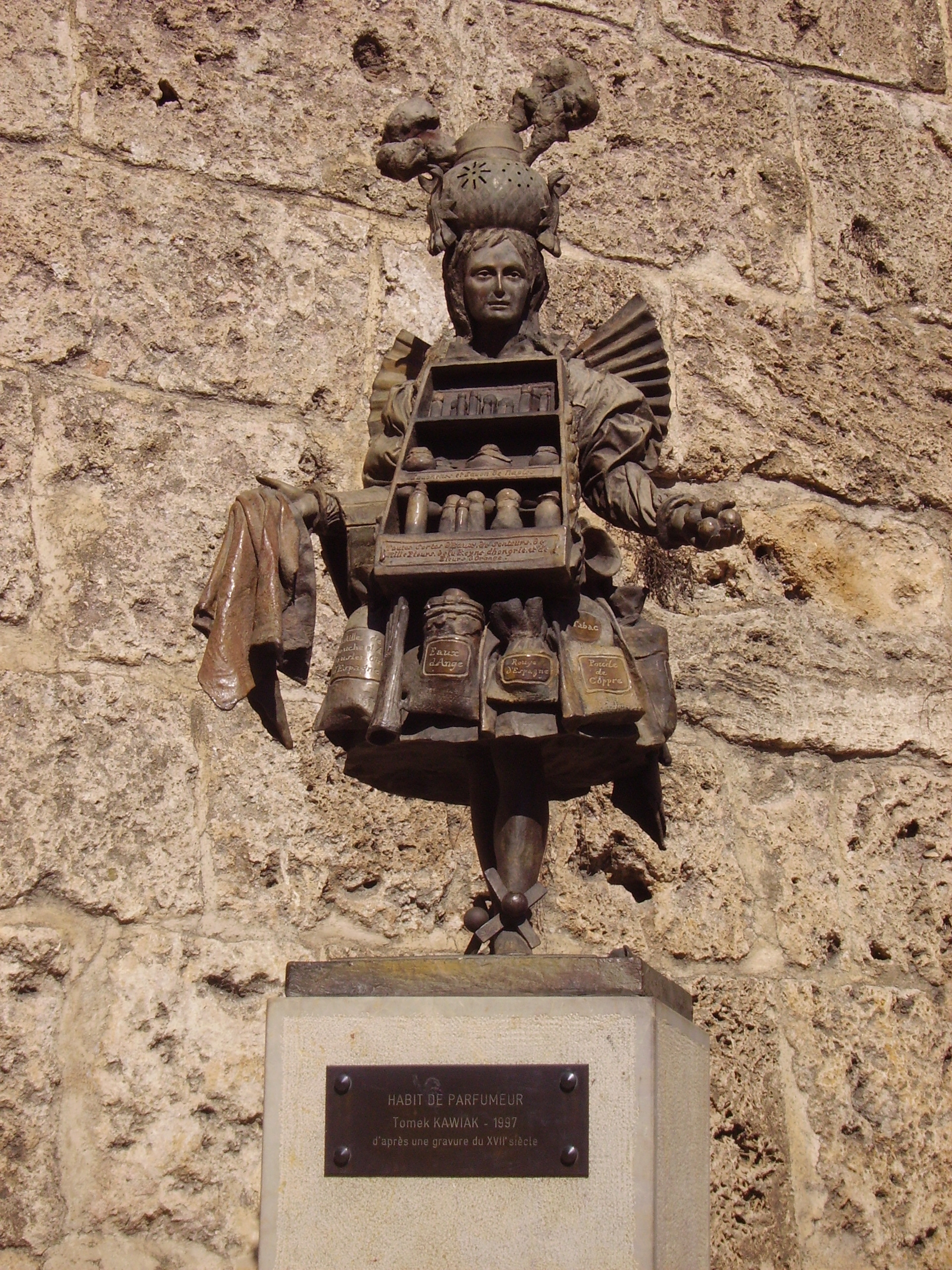
Bronze Parfumeur

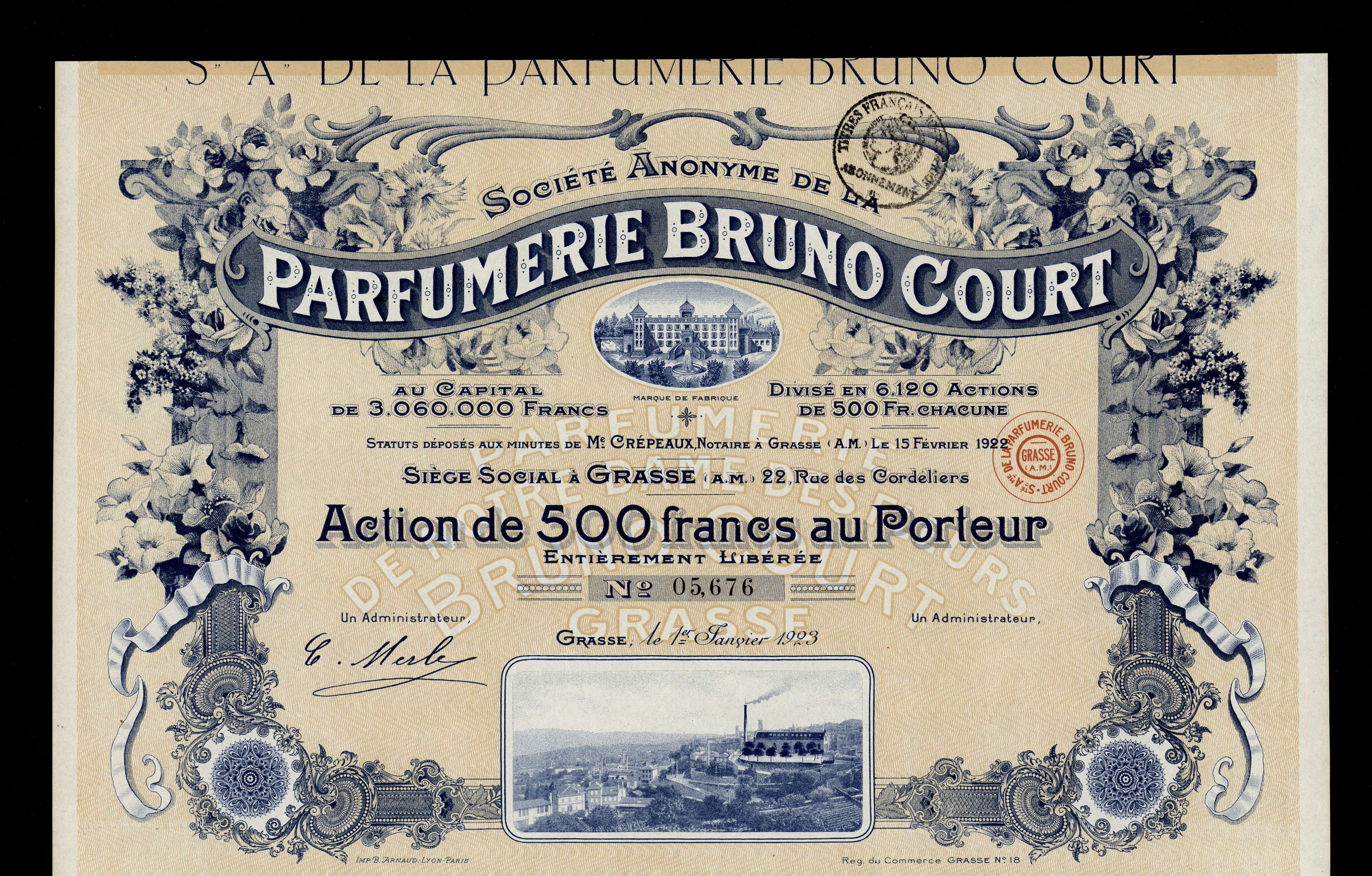
Share of the S. A. de la Parfumerie Bruno Court, issued 1 January 1923

Grasse has had a prospering perfume industry since the end of the 18th century. Grasse is the centre of the French perfume industry and is known as the world's perfume capital (la capitale mondiale des parfums). Many "noses" (or, in French, "les nez" (plural)/"le nez" (singular)) are trained or have spent time in Grasse to distinguish over 2,000 kinds of scents. Grasse produces over two-thirds of France's natural aromas (for perfume and for food flavourings). This industry turns over more than 600 million euros a year. Grasse's particular microclimate encouraged the flower farming industry. It is warm and sufficiently inland to be sheltered from the sea air. There is an abundance of water, thanks to its location in the hills and the 1860 construction of the Siagne canal for irrigation purposes. The town is 350 m (1,148.29 ft) above sea level and 20 km (12 mi) from the coast (Côte d'Azur). Jasmine, a key ingredient of many perfumes, was brought to southern France by the Moors in the 16th century. Twenty-seven tonnes of jasmine are now harvested in Grasse annually. There are numerous old 'parfumeries' in Grasse, such as Galimard, Molinard and Fragonard, each with tours and a museum.

The trade in leather and tanning work developed during the twelfth century around the small canal that runs through the city. This activity produced a strong unpleasant odour. At the time of the Renaissance perfume manufacturers began production of gloves, handbags and belt (clothing), to meet the new fashion from Italy with the entourage of Queen Catherine de Medici.

The countryside around the city began to grow fields of flowers, offering new scents from the city. In 1614, the king recognized the new corporation of "glovers perfumers". In the middle of the eighteenth century, the perfumery was experiencing a very important development. Leading companies dating from this period includes the oldest French perfumerie, and third oldest parfumerie in Europe, Galimard established in 1747. Introduction of new production methods turned perfume making into a real industry that could adapt to new market demands.

In the nineteenth century, the raw materials began to be imported from abroad. During the twentieth century the creation of synthetic products brought the democratization and affordability of perfumes and their spin-offs; (shampoos and deodorants, cream (pharmaceutical) and detergents, food flavouring for cookies, ice cream and dairy products, beverages, convenience foods, confectionery, preserves and syrups). In 1905, six hundred tons of flowers were harvested while in the 1940s, five thousand tons were produced annually. However, in early 2000, production was less than 30 tons for all flowers combined.

=== Historical activity ===
In the Middle Ages, Grasse specialised in leather tanning. Once tanned, the hides were often exported to Genoa or Pisa, cities that shared a commercial alliance with Grasse. Several centuries of this intense activity witnessed many technological advances within tanning industries. The hides of Grasse acquired a reputation for high quality. But the leather smelled bad, something that did not please the glove wearing nobility. This is when Jean de Galimard, a tanner in Grasse, came up with the idea of scented leather gloves. He offered a pair of scented gloves to Catherine de' Medici, who was seduced by the gift. Thereafter, the product spread through the Royal Court and high society, and this made a worldwide reputation for Grasse. The seventeenth century became the heyday of "Glovers Perfumers"; however, high taxes on leather and competition from Nice brought a decline for the leather industry in Grasse, and production of leather fragrance ceased. The rare scents from the Grasse (lavender, myrtle, jasmine, rose, orange blossom and wild mimosa) did win the title for the Grasse as the perfume capital of the world. Harvesting jasmine was a labour-intensive business only a few decades ago. Flowers had to be hand picked at dawn, when their scent is the most developed and immediately to be treated by cold enfleurage.

=== Modern industry ===
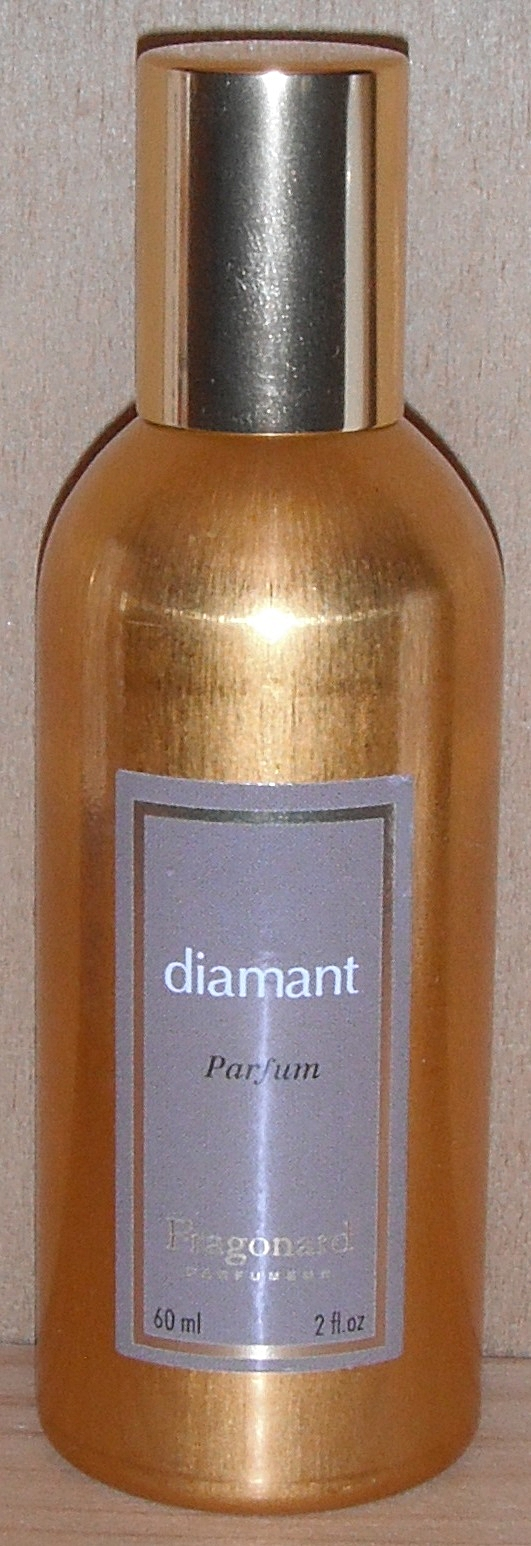
Fragonard Diamant

A network of sixty companies employs 3,500 people in the city and surrounding area. Additionally, about 10,000 residents of Grasse are indirectly employed by the perfume industry. Almost half of the business tax for the city comes from the perfume sector and that is ahead of tourism and services. The main activity of perfumery in Grasse is in the production of natural raw materials (essential oils, concretes, absolutes, resinoids and molecular distillation) and the production of concentrate, also called the juice. A concentrate is the main product that when diluted in at least 80% alcohol provides a perfume. Also, food flavourings, which have developed since the 1970s, account for over half of production output today.

This represents almost half of the production of French perfumes and aromas and around 7-8% of total global activity. However, during the 1960s and 1970s large international groups gradually bought up local family factories (Chiris, Givaudan-Roure and Lautier, for example). Soon after their production was often relocated overseas. Just 30 years ago most companies were focused on the production of raw materials. However, an overwhelming majority of the modern fragrances contain synthetic chemicals in part or in whole. Grasse perfume companies have therefore adapted by turning to aromatic synthesis and especially to food flavourings and successfully ended a long stagnation. The Grasse perfume industry cannot compete against large chemical multinationals, but it benefits greatly from the advantage of its knowledge of raw materials, facilities, contractors, etc. In addition, major brands such as Dior and Chanel have their own plantations of roses and jasmine in the vicinity of Grasse.

=== Perfumeries ===
Three perfumeries, Fragonard, Molinard and Galimard opened their doors to the public and offer free tours that explain the processes of producing a perfume. It is possible to create one's own perfume, eau de perfume or eau de toilette and participate in all stages of manufacture from picking flowers to bottling.

- Galimard Perfumery, established in 1747 by Jean de Galimard, provided the Royal Court with ointments and perfumes. It is the third oldest perfume company in the world after Farina gegenüber and Floris of London and was revived after the war by Gaston de Fontmichel and Joseph Roux.
- Molinard was established in 1849 and their perfume bottles were made of Baccarat crystal and Lalique glass. Clients can create their own personalised perfume during the Tarinology fragrance course workshop.
- The Fragonard Perfumery was established in 1926 in one of the oldest factories in the city. Its museum Villa Musée Fragonard displays rare objects that explain the history of perfumery, covering 5,000 years.
- International Perfume Museum. Opened in 1989, the museum traces the evolution of techniques during the 5,000-year history of perfumery and the large contribution of the Grasse area to perfume making. It was renovated and expanded (doubling in size) between 2007 and 2008.

== Population ==
Historical population

Year	Pop.	±% p.a.
1793	11,604	—
1800	12,521	+1.09%
1806	12,262	−0.35%
1821	12,553	+0.16%
1831	12,716	+0.13%
1836	12,825	+0.17%
1841	10,906	−3.19%
1846	11,676	+1.37%
1851	11,802	+0.21%
1856	11,764	−0.06%
1861	12,015	+0.42%
1866	12,241	+0.37%
1872	12,560	+0.43%
1876	13,087	+1.03%
1881	12,087	−1.58%
1886	12,157	+0.12%
1891	14,015	+2.89%
1896	15,020	+1.39%
1901	15,429	+0.54%

Year	Pop.	±% p.a.
1906	20,305	+5.65%
1911	19,704	−0.60%
1921	16,923	−1.51%
1926	19,765	+3.15%
1931	21,027	+1.25%
1936	20,481	−0.52%
1946	21,217	+0.35%
1954	22,187	+0.56%
1962	26,258	+2.13%
1968	30,907	+2.75%
1975	34,579	+1.62%
1982	37,673	+1.23%
1990	41,388	+1.18%
1999	43,874	+0.65%
2007	50,257	+1.71%
2012	51,021	+0.30%
2017	50,396	−0.25%
2023	50,970	+0.19%

Source: EHESS and INSEE (1968-2023)

== Grasse today ==
The town is home to Grasse Cathedral, the seat of the Roman Catholic former Diocese of Grasse which was headed by the Bishops of Grasse. The town is home to the Lycée Amiral-de-Grasse and since 2019 one of two seats of the higher education engineering college ECAM-EPMI. RC Grasse is the local football club, whereas RO Grasse the local rugby union club. Grasse station offers railway connections with Cannes, Nice and Ventimiglia. From 1909 to 1938, the town centre was connected to the railway station by the Grasse Funicular.

There is an annual Fête du Jasmin or La Jasminade, at the beginning of August. The first festival was on August 3–4, 1946. Decorated floats drive through the town, with young women in skimpy costumes on board, throwing flowers into the crowd. Garlands of jasmine decorate the town centre, and the fire department fills a fire truck with jasmine-infused water to spray on the crowds. There are fireworks, free parties, folk music groups and street performers. There is also an annual international exhibition of roses ("Expo Rose") held in May each year.

Three perfume factories offer daily tours and demonstrations, which draw in many of the region's visitors. In addition to the perfumeries, Grasse's other main attraction is the Cathedral, dedicated to Notre Dame du Puy and founded in the 11th century. In the interior, are three works by Rubens and one by Jean-Honoré Fragonard, the French painter native of the town.

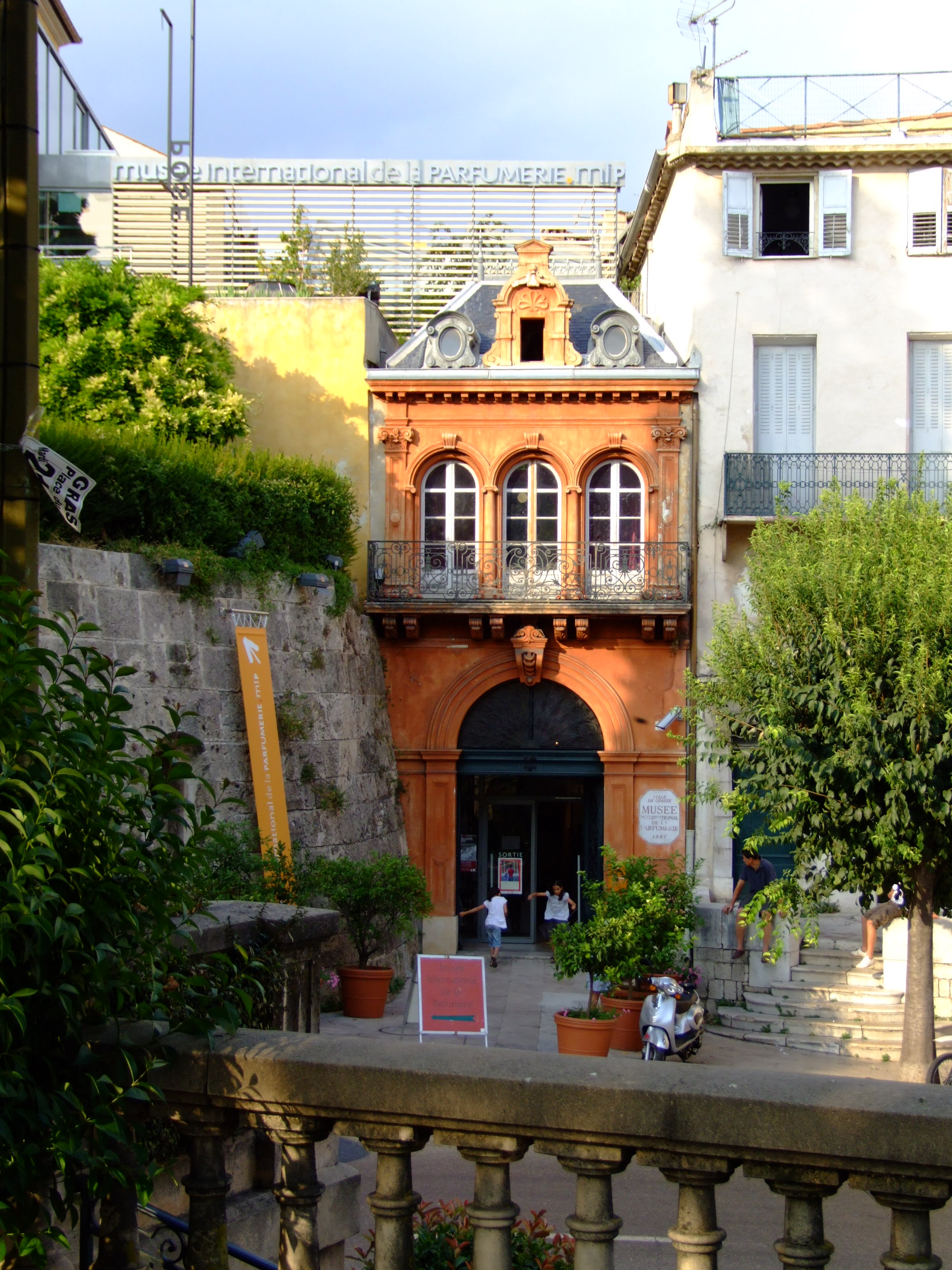
Grasse – Parfumerie

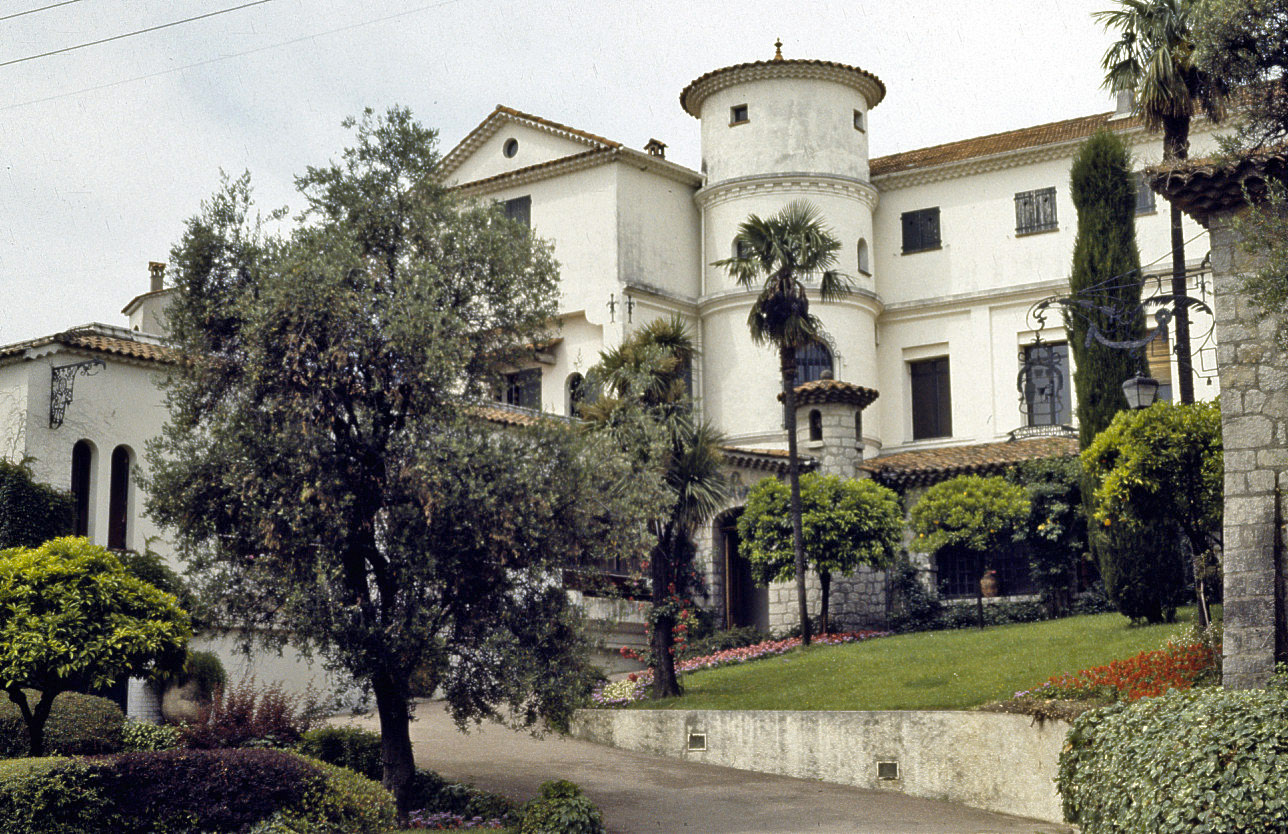
Parfumerie Molinard

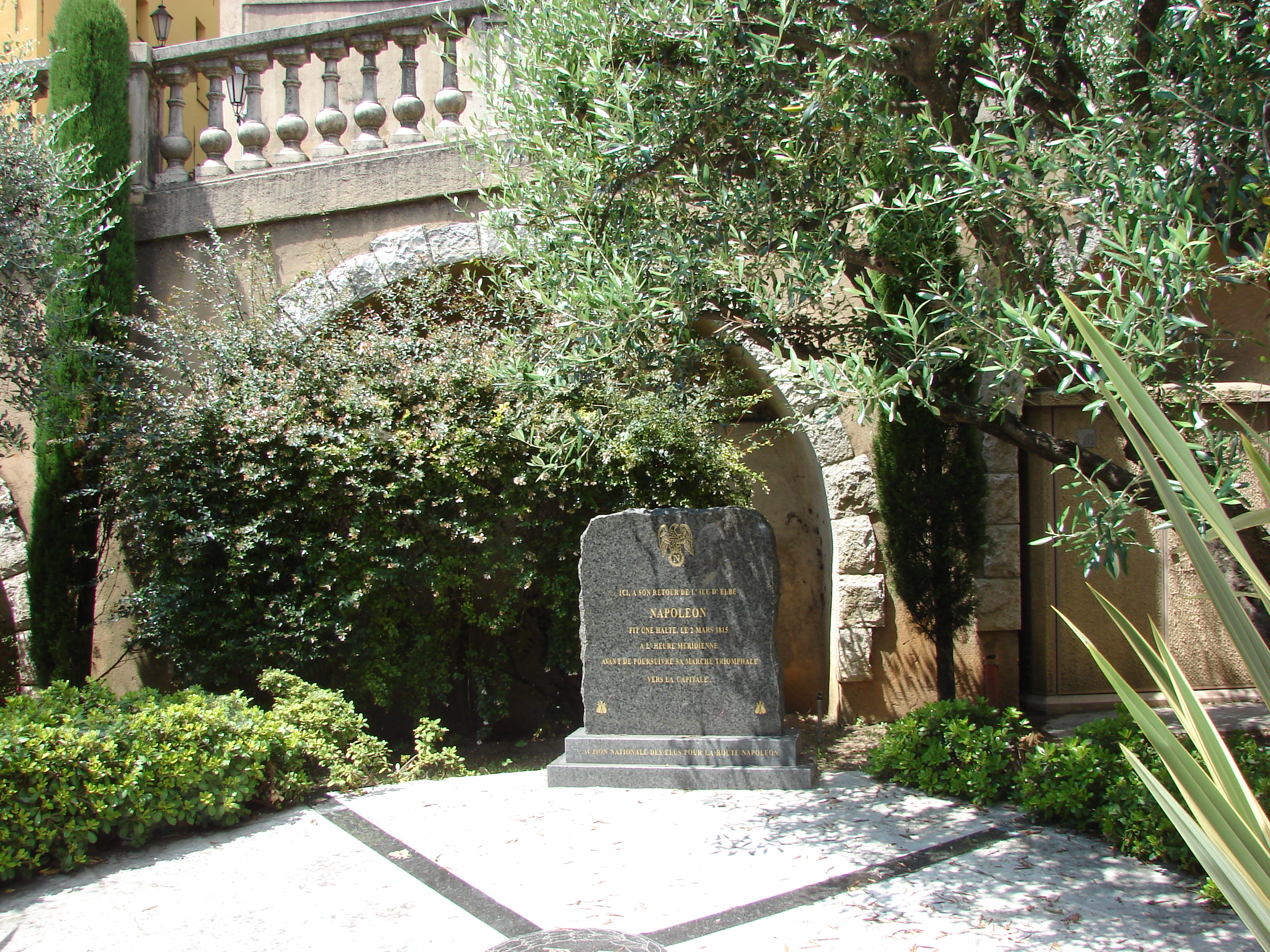
Napoleon Memorial

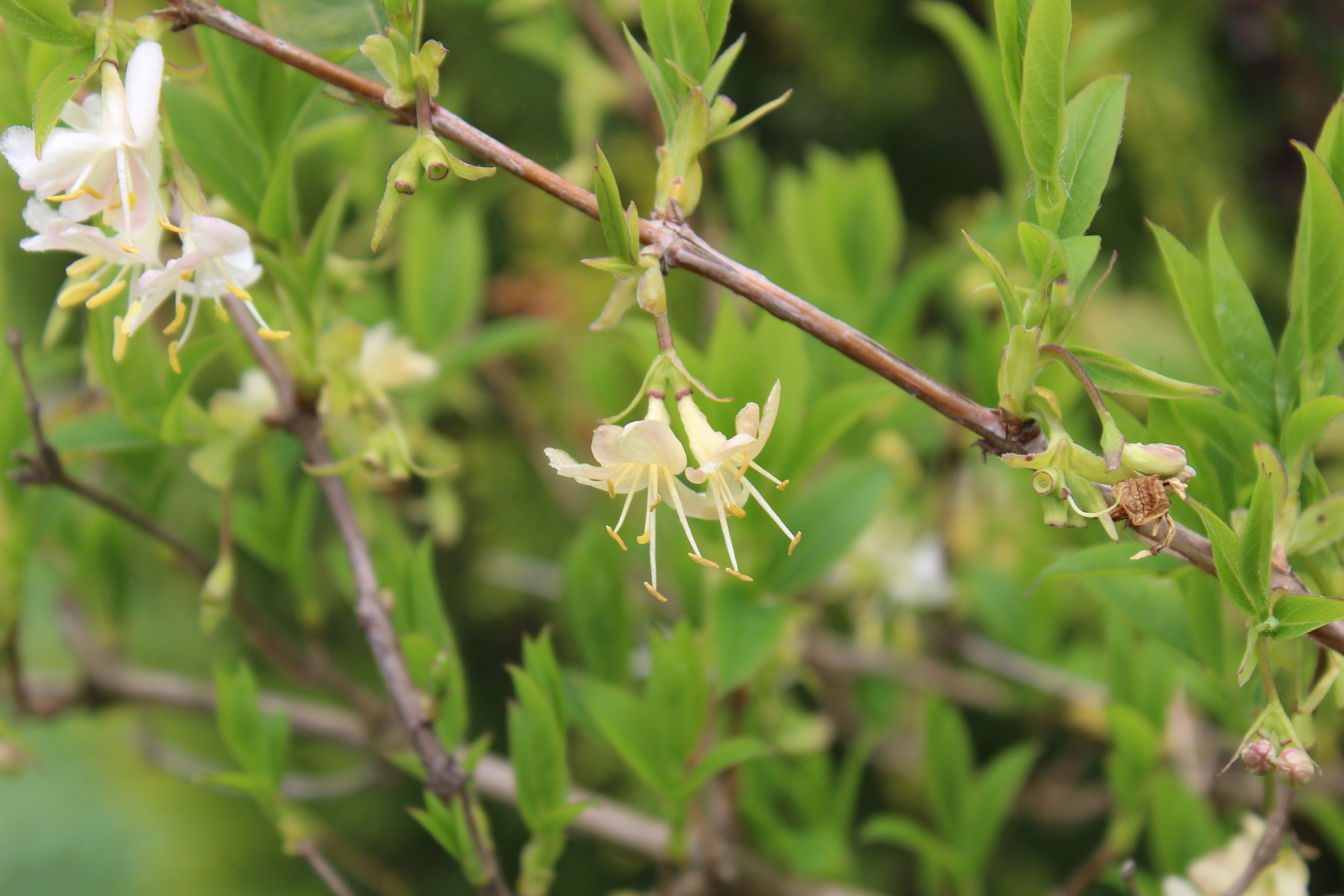
Fleur de jasmin

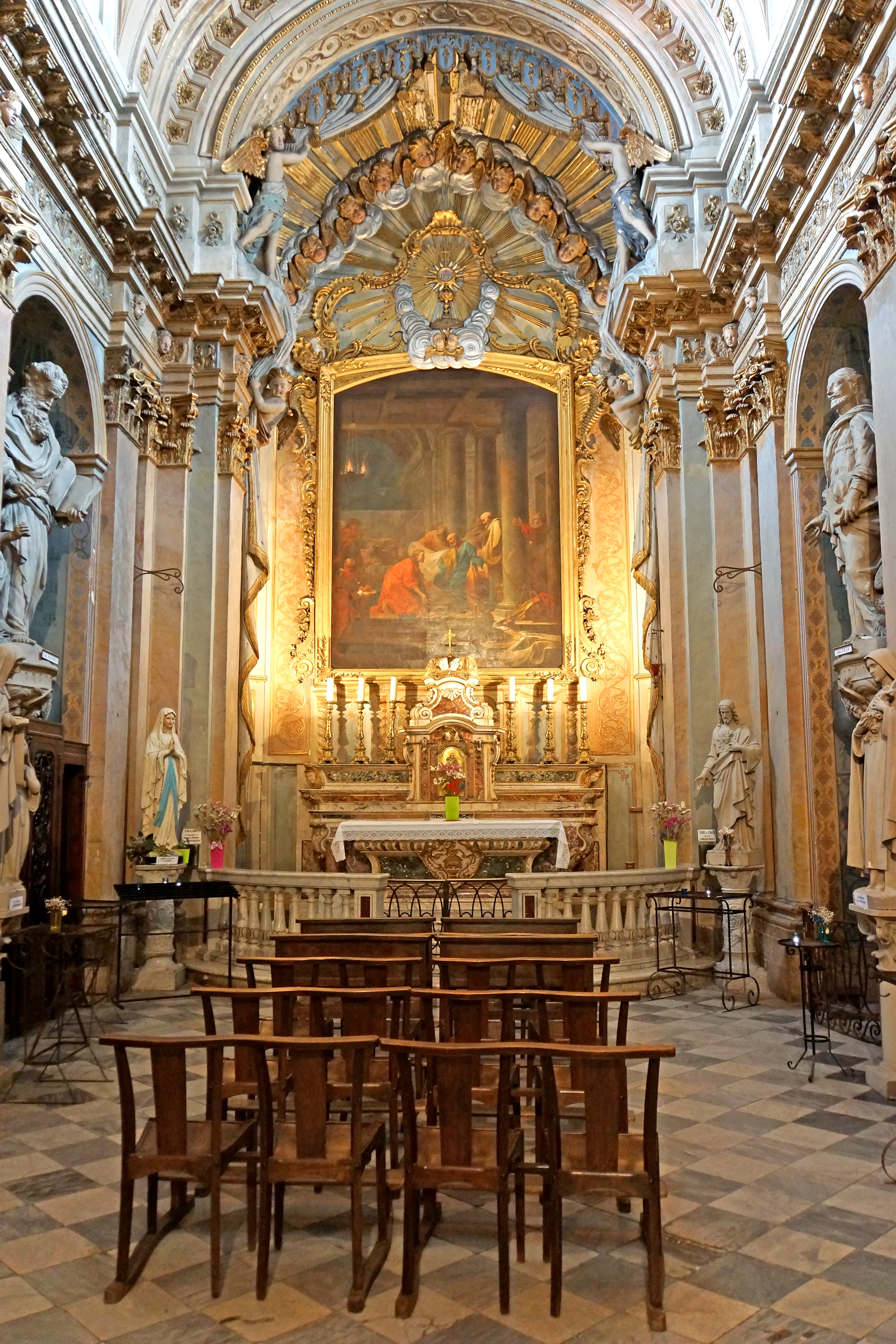
Blessed Sacrament chapel

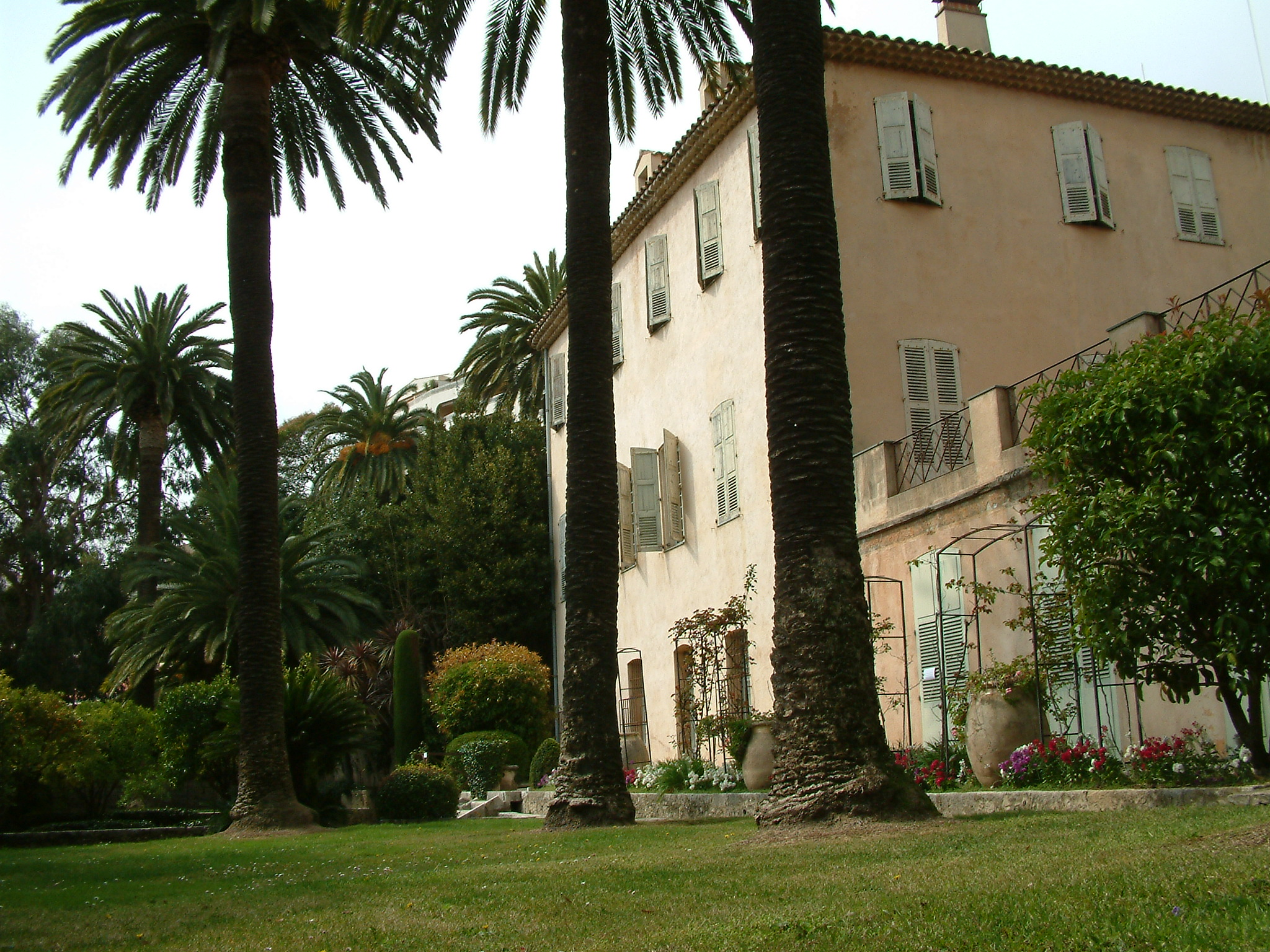
Villa Musée Fragonard

Other sights include:

- Saracen Tower, standing at 30m.
- Monumental gate of the Hôtel de Ville (town hall)
- International Museum of Perfume
- Musée d'Art et d'Histoire de Provence
- Church of Plascassier, built in 1644
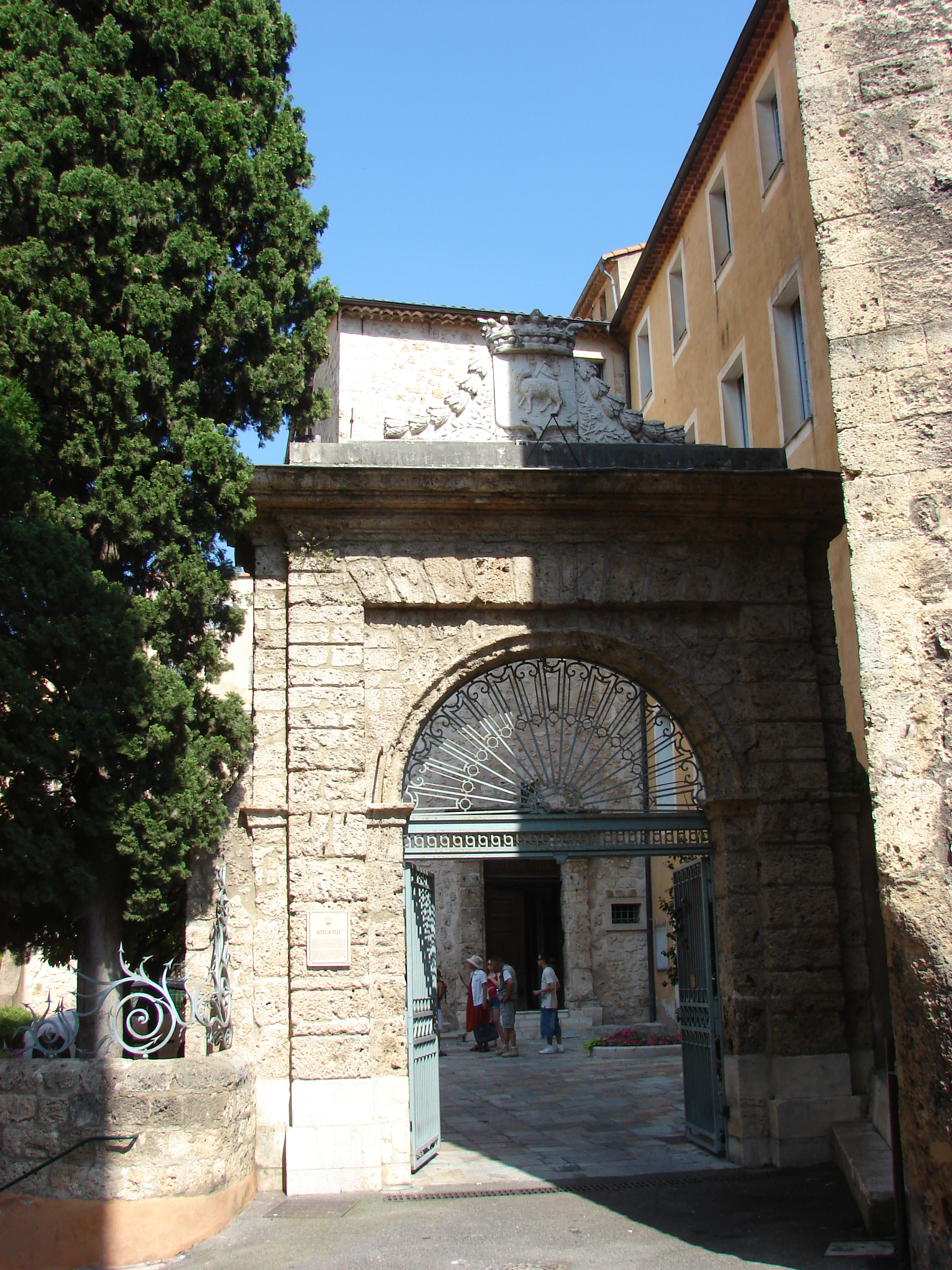
Monumental gate of the Hôtel de Ville

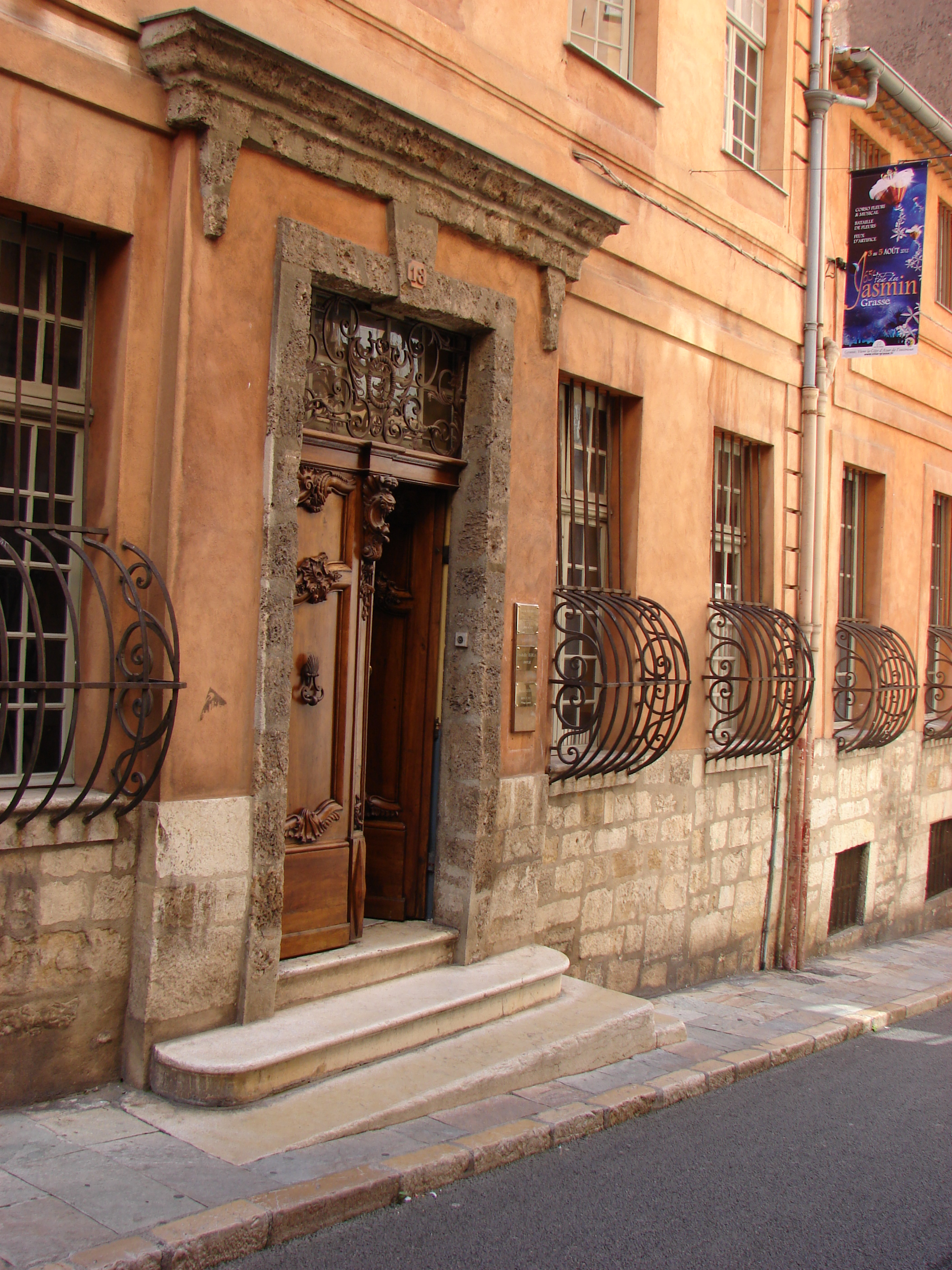
Hotel Court de Fontmichel

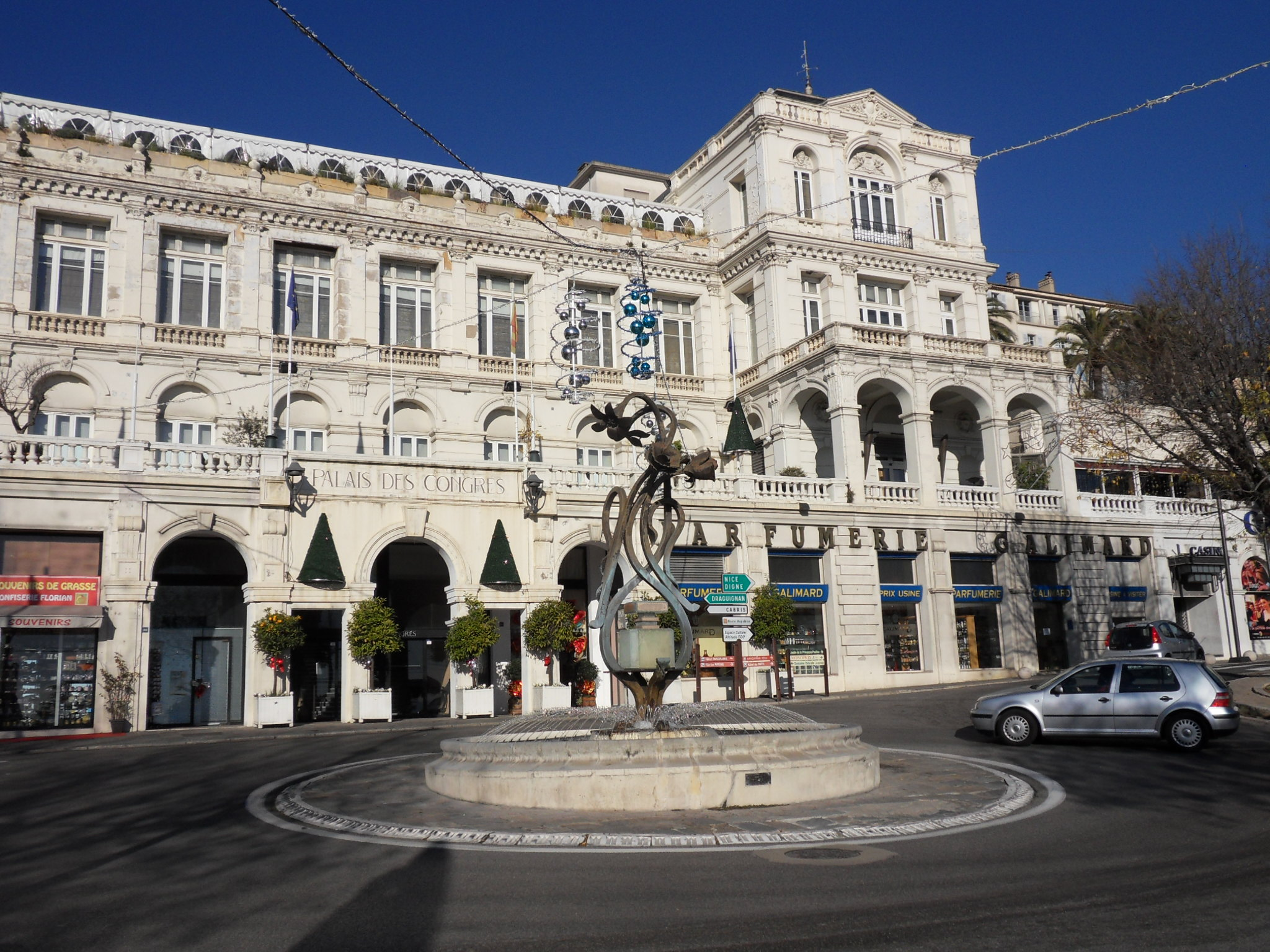
Palais des congrès

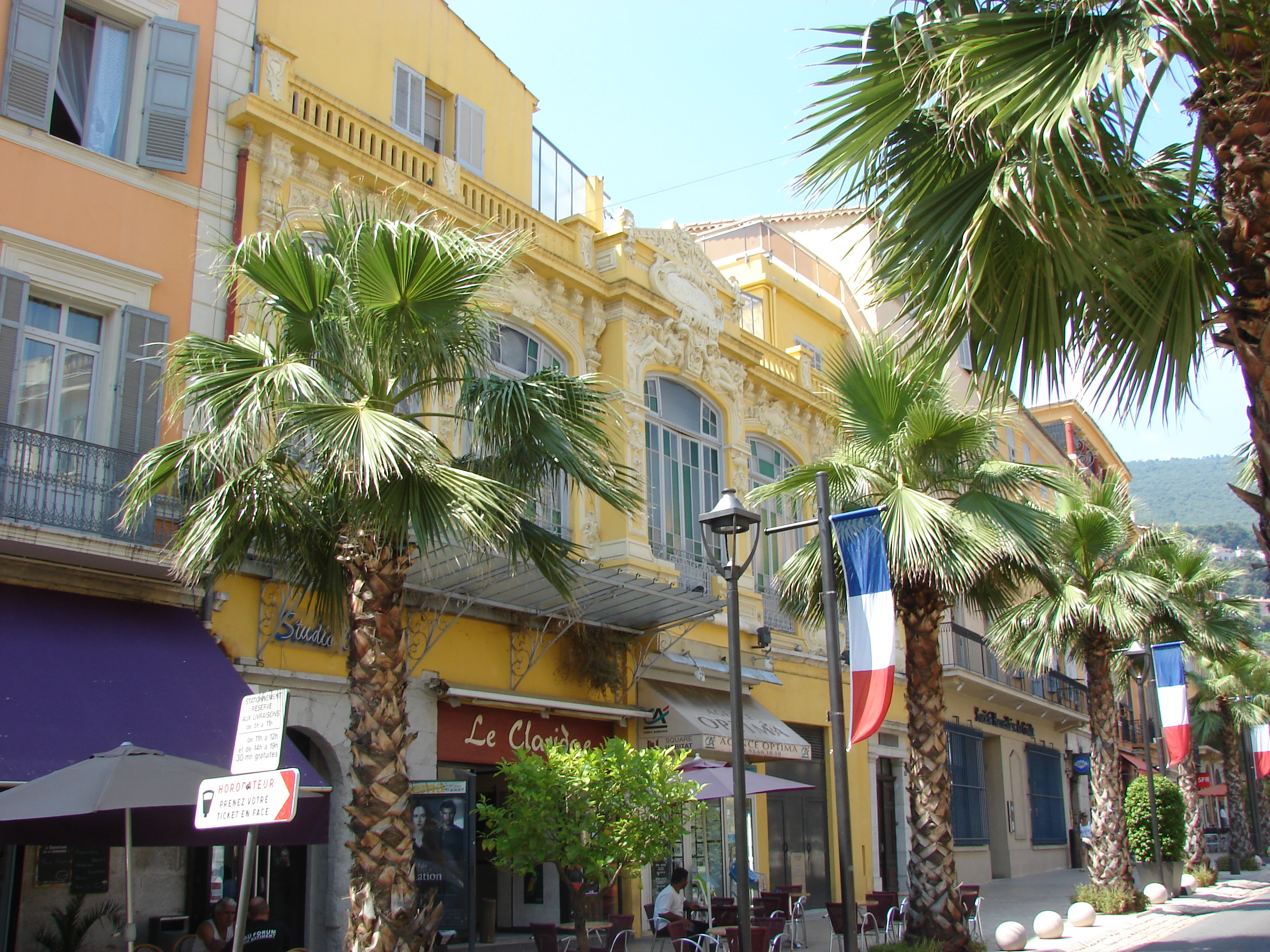
Boulevard du Jeu de Ballon

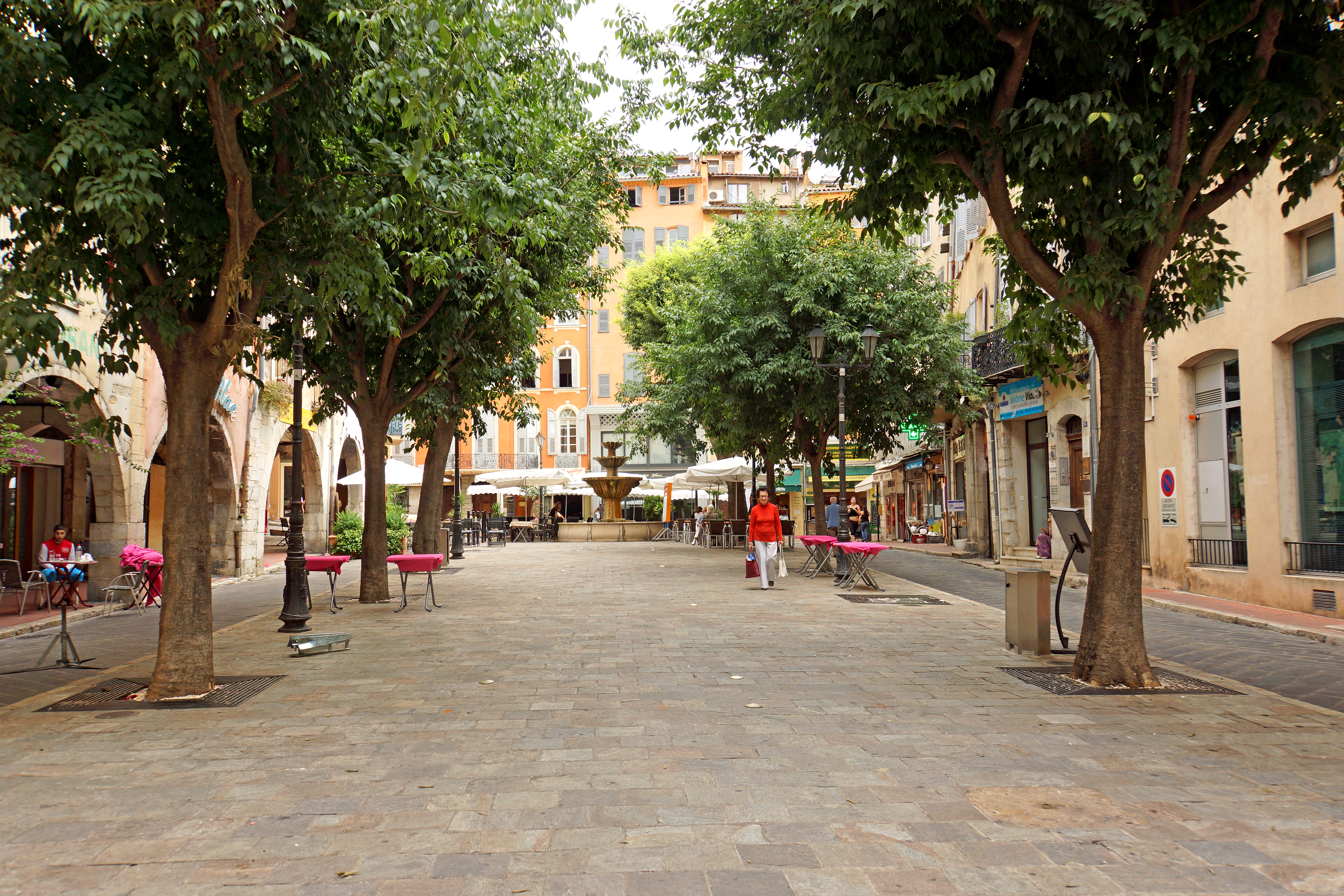
Place aux Aires

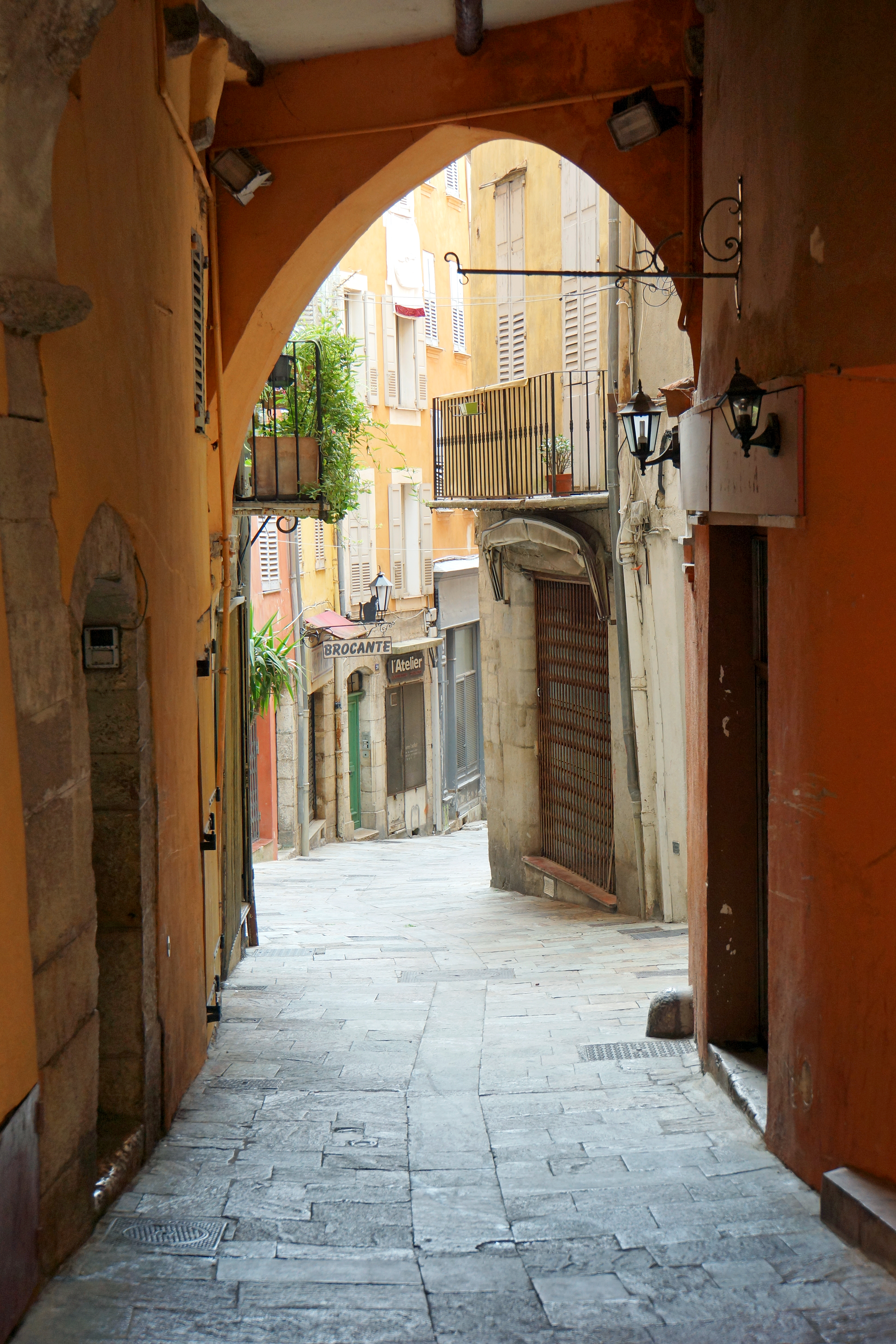
Side street in Old Town

The town is the setting in the final chapters of the novel Perfume by Patrick Süskind. It was featured in the film based on the novel Perfume: The Story of a Murderer (2006).

== Notable people ==
Grasse was the birthplace of:

- Louis Bellaud (1543–1588), also known as Bellaud de la Bellaudière, poet
- Claude-Marie Courmes (1770–1865), trader, shipowner and politician. Mayor of Grasse, deputy for Var and General Councilor of Var Canton of Grasse-Nord.
- Mélanie Bernier (born 1985), actress
- Adam Bessa, (born 1992), actor
- Frédéric Bourdillon (born 1991), French-Israeli basketball player in the Israel Basketball Premier League
- Jacques Cavallier (born 1962), perfumer
- Albert Charpin (1842–1924), painter
- Olivier Cresp (born 1955), perfumer
- Jean-Claude Ellena (born 1947), perfumer
- Alexandre-Évariste Fragonard (1780–1850), painter and sculptor
- Jean-Honoré Fragonard (1732–1806), painter
- Jean Claude Gandur (born 1949), businessman
- Gazan de la Peyrière (1765–1845), general during the Napoleonic Wars
- Valentine Goby (born 1974), writer
- Marcel Journet (1868–1933), operatic baritone
- Vincent Koziello (born 1995), footballer
- Eugénie Le Sommer (born 1989), footballer
- Pierre-Louis Lions (born 1956), mathematician
- Gilles Marini (born 1976), actor
- Michèle Mouton (born 1951), rally driver
- Charles Pasqua (1927–2015), businessman and politician
- Thomas Pinault (born 1981), footballer
- Théo Pourchaire (born 2003), racing driver

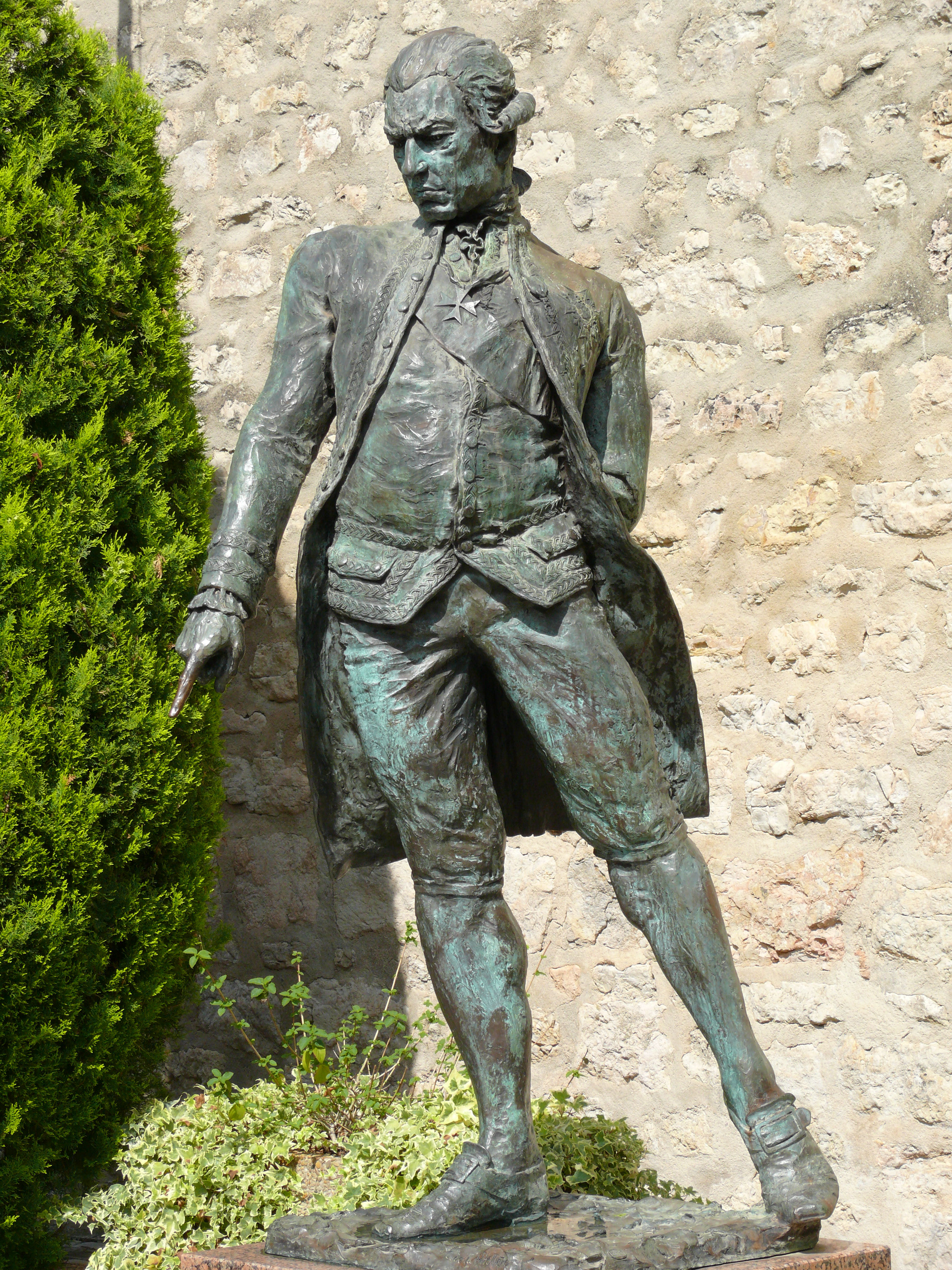
Statue François Joseph Paul de Grasse, admiral de Grasse

Grasse was the death place of:

- Christian Calmes (1913–1995), Luxembourgish civil servant, lawyer and historian
- François Joseph Paul de Grasse (1723–1788), admiral, commanded the French fleet at the Battle of the Chesapeake, which led directly to the Siege of Yorktown.
- David Douglas Duncan (1916–2018), American photojournalist
- Prince Eugen of Bavaria (1925–1997), member of the Bavarian Royal House of Wittelsbach
- Lolo Ferrari (1963–2000), dancer, actress and singer with breast implants
- Édith Piaf (1915–1963), singer
- Frederic Prokosch (1906–1989), American writer
- Marcus Eli Ravage (1884-1965), Jewish-American essayist, journalist, biographer; settled in Grasse after WW2
- Yvonne Rozille (1900–1985), film actress
- Eugène Sémérie (1832–1884), positivist activist

Other notables associated with Grasse:

- Dirk Bogarde (1921–1999), actor, lived in Grasse
- Ivan Bunin (1870–1953), Russian writer, Nobel Prize in Literature, 1933; lived in Grasse
- Gérard Philipe (1922–1959), actor, brought up in Grasse
- Alice Charlotte von Rothschild (1847–1922), patron of the arts; art collection was donated to the town of Grasse
- H. G. Wells (1866–1946), British writer

== Twin towns – sister cities ==
Grasse is twinned with:

- Carrara, Italy, since 1995
- Ingolstadt, Germany, since 1963
- (United States) Marblehead, Massachusetts, USA, since 1986
- Murcia, Spain, since 1990
- Opole, Poland, since 1964
- Pardes Hanna-Karkur, Israel, since 2014
- Vila Real, Portugal, since 1975

== See also ==
- Route Napoléon
- Ancient Diocese of Grasse
- Communes of the Alpes-Maritimes department
- Famille Courmes
