= Hôtel de Ville, Grasse =

Town hall in Grasse, France

Hôtel de Ville
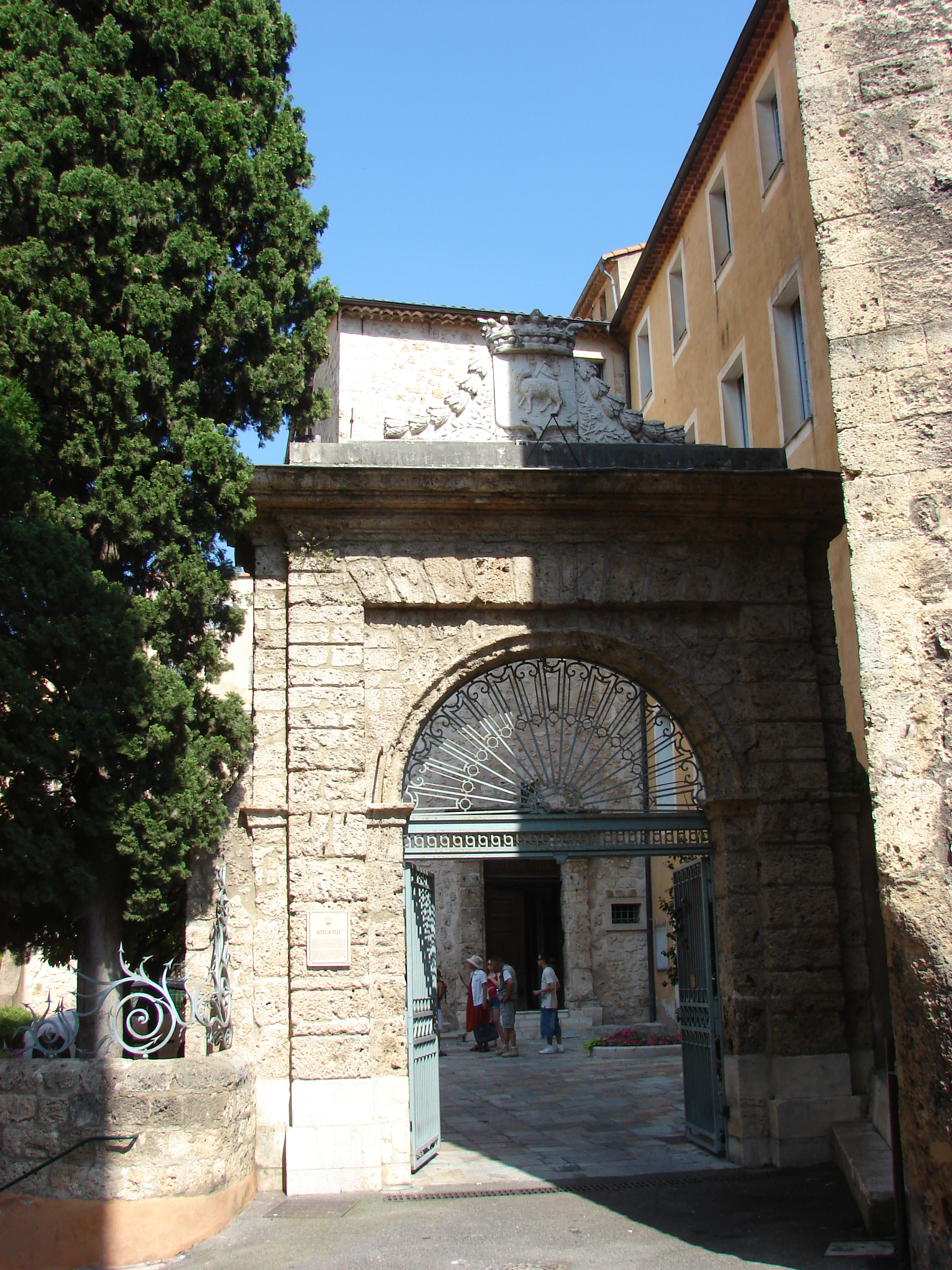
- The portal of the Hôtel de Ville in July 2010

General information
- Type: City hall
- Architectural style: Medieval style
- Location: Grasse, France
- Coordinates: 43.6581°N 6.9246°E
- Completed: 1790

Monument historique
- Official name: Palais épiscopal (ancien)
- Type: Inscrit
- Designated: 1937
- Reference no.: PA00080740

The Hôtel de Ville (French pronunciation: [otɛl də vil], City Hall) is a municipal building in Grasse, Alpes-Maritimes, southern France, standing on Place du Petit Puy. It is located in the Palais épiscopal (Bishop's Palace) which was designated a monument historique by the French government in 1937.

== History ==
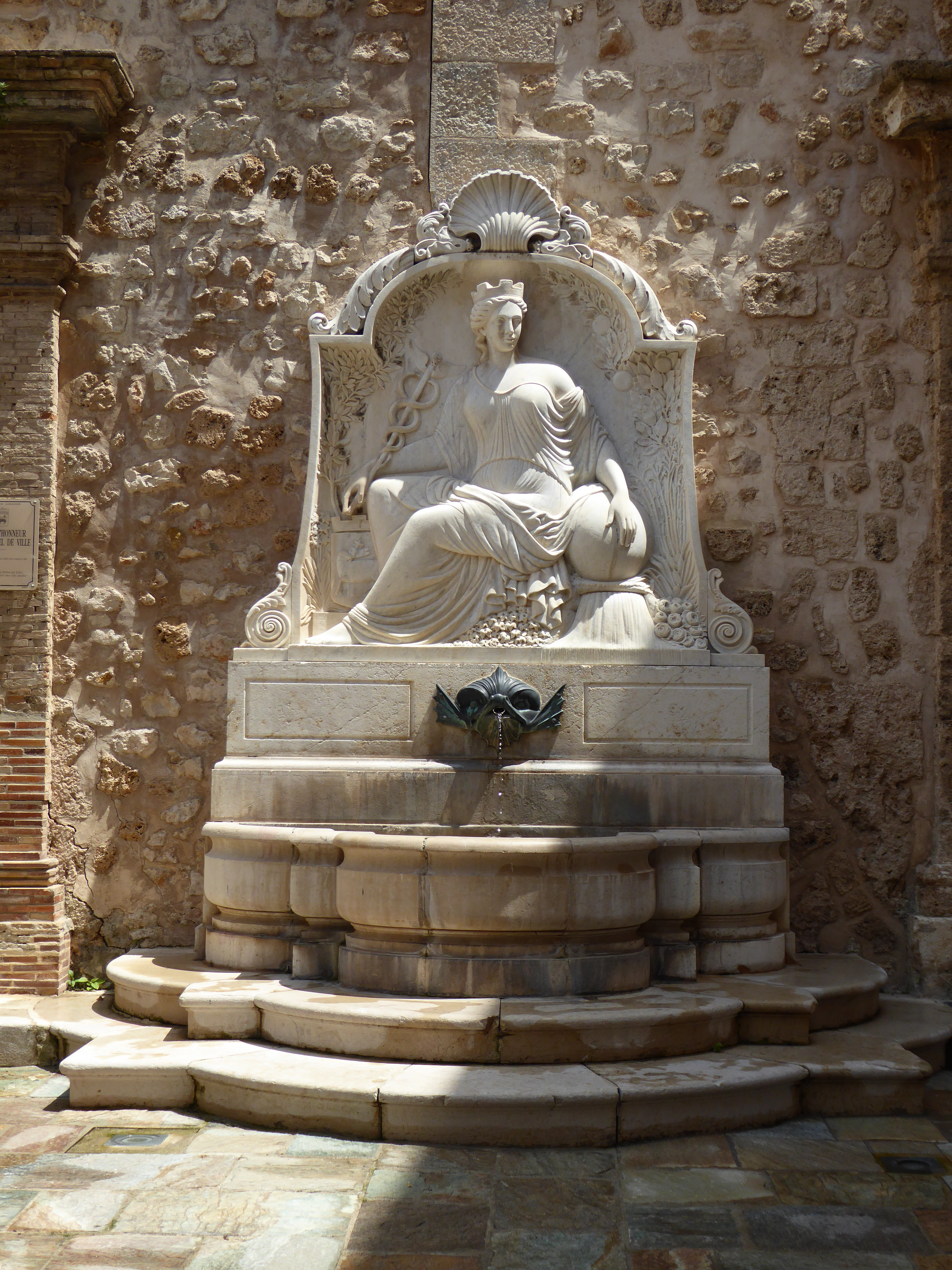
The fountain in the courtyard

The building was commissioned as the Palais épiscopal (Bishop's Palace) around the time that the bishopric was transferred from Antibes to Grasse by order of Pope Innocent IV in 1244. The site chosen by the new bishop was immediately to the north of Grasse Cathedral.

The layout involved a five-stage defensive tower, known as the Tour de l'évêque (Bishop's Tower), to the west, and two long buildings (one sited behind and to the right of the other) to the east. Access was through a monumental portal, with a round headed iron gate, behind the tower. This led to a small courtyard providing access through two openings, each formed by a pair of Doric order pilasters supporting an entablature and a cornice. The left-hand opening led to a small garden with panoramic views over the town, while the right-hand opening, with a wooden door, led into the palace. Internally, the principal rooms were the vestibule on the ground floor, the Salle Synodale (the meeting room of the synod) on the first floor, and the Chapelle de l'évêque (bishop's chapel), which featured a vaulted ceiling, on the second floor.

The building continued to serve as the home of the bishops until the diocese of Grasse was suppressed by decree of the National Constituent Assembly of France on 22 November 1790. It was then seized by the state and became the town hall of Grasse. In the late 18th century, the building was converted for municipal use: the meeting room of the synod became a council chamber, while the bishop's chapel became a wedding room. A fountain designed by the local sculptor, Cammile Rabuis, depicting a female figure holding a sceptre and a terrestrial globe, intended to serve as an allegory for Grasse as the city of perfume, was installed in the courtyard in 1855.

A major programme of refurbishment works to the town hall complex, carried out at a cost of €1.1 million, was initiated by the mayor, Jérôme Viaud, in December 2021. The work involved the restoration of the paintings and tapestries, and the installation of a new chandelier, 9 metres (30 ft) high, on the staircase, as well as repairs to the masonry.
