= Molinard =

French perfume company

Maison Molinard
- Type: Private
- Industry: Perfumery
- Founded: 1849
- Founder: Molinard family
- Headquarters: Grasse, Provence, France
- Area served: Worldwide
- Products: Perfumes, eau de Cologne, floral waters, solid perfumes
- Website: Official website

Maison Molinard is a historic French perfume house founded in 1849 in Grasse, Provence. One of the oldest family-run perfumeries in France, the company gained early recognition for its floral waters, Eau de Cologne, and later its signature single-flower fragrances. Molinard is noted for its collaborations with renowned designers, including Baccarat, René Lalique, and Julien Viard, and continues to operate from its original distillery building, designed by Gustave Eiffel.

== History ==
The company was founded in 1849 in Grasse, in the south of France, a historic centre of Europe's perfume industry. It has remained an entirely family-run business to this day, and is also one of the oldest of its kind in France after Galimard established in 1747 (though not run by the original founding family). At that time, Molinard produced floral waters and Eau de Cologne, which was sold in its "little shop" in the Grasse town centre. In 1860, the firm began creating new single floral fragrances from Jasmin, Rose, Mimosa and Violet in discreet, elegant bottles made of Baccarat crystal.

In 1900, the company moved into an old perfume factory, where the distillery structure was designed by Gustave Eiffel and perfumery is still based there today. Molinard's first customers were wealthy foreigners from England and Russia who came to the French Riviera and also bought Molinard's eau de Cologne and other floral fragrances.

In 1920, the famous bottle-designer Julien Viard (1883-1938) created several glass flacon designs for company perfumes. In 1921, the firm launched one of the first solid perfumes, Concréta, a fragranced natural flower wax used directly as a perfume.

During the 1920s and 1930s Art-Deco interwar period, the company also hired glassmaker René Lalique of Lalique to design and produce many bottles for Molinard that are sought-after collector's items today.
