= Gregory Serper =

Uzbekistani-American chess grandmaster (born 1969)

Personal information
- Born: September 14, 1969 (age 57) Tashkent, Uzbek SSR, Soviet Union

Chess career
- Country: Soviet Union → Uzbekistan (before 1996); United States (after 1996)
- Title: Grandmaster (1992)
- FIDE rating: 2522 (November 2026)
- Peak rating: 2600 (January 1993)
- Peak ranking: No. 53 (January 1993)

Gregory Serper (Russian: Григорий Юрьевич Серпер, romanized: Grigory Yurievich Serper; born September 14, 1969) is an Uzbekistani-American chess grandmaster.

== Biography ==
He was born in Tashkent, in the former Uzbek Soviet Socialist Republic of the Soviet Union (present Uzbekistan). At age 6, he learned to play chess from his grandfather. In 1985, at age 16, he started studies at Moscow's famous Botvinnik-Kasparov Chess School.

During his military service in Novosibirsk, he attended the 27th World Junior Chess Championship held in 1988 in Adelaide, Australia. In this strong tournament Serper took 3rd place with same score 9/13 as his opponents Lautier, Ivanchuk and Gelfand who took 1st, 2nd and 4th place respectively.

In 1992, as a member of the Uzbekistan team, Serper won the silver medal in the 30th Chess Olympiad.

In January 1996 he moved with his family to the United States. In 1999, Serper won the World Open tournament after drawing an Armageddon playoff game as Black against Boris Gulko, who had been one of nine players who had tied with Serper in the main event. In the same year, he advanced to the finals of the U.S. Chess Championship by defeating Alex Yermolinsky in the semifinals, but lost in the finals to Gulko.

Serper regularly writes articles for Chess.com under the username "Gserper".

== Notable game ==
Position: a8 black rook, c8 black bishop, e8 black king, f8 black knight, h8 black rook, c7 black queen, f7 black pawn, g7 black bishop, a6 black pawn, c6 black pawn, g6 black pawn, c5 white pawn, d5 white knight, e5 black pawn, h5 black knight, a4 white pawn, b4 black pawn, e4 white pawn, h4 black pawn, e3 white bishop, f3 white pawn, b2 white pawn, d2 white queen, e2 white bishop, f2 white knight, g2 white pawn, h2 white pawn, a1 white rook, f1 white rook, g1 white king

Serper-Nikolaidis, position after 17.Nd5!

Chess Informant's panel of judges voted the following game the second-best game of the 666 games in Volume 59 of Chess Informant. Larry Christiansen rated it his sixth favorite attacking game of the 1990s. Yasser Seirawan wrote, "Can you imagine a game in which you sacrifice ... all of your pieces? Toss in the promotion of two pawns as well and you have a game to last!

Serper-Ioannis Nikolaidis, St. Petersburg Open 1993:

1.c4 g6 2.e4 Bg7 3.d4 d6 4.Nc3 Nf6 5.Nge2 Nbd7 6.Ng3 c6 7.Be2 a6 8.Be3 h5 9.f3 b5 10.c5 dxc5 11.dxc5 Qc7 12.O-O h4 13.Nh1 Nh5 14.Qd2 e5 15.Nf2 Nf8? Seirawan recommended 15...Nf4 16.Nd3! Bh6 17.a4! with advantage to White. 16.a4 b4 17.Nd5! Eschewing the quiet 17.Ncd1 or 17.Na2, White sacrifices a piece to obtain two mobile connected passed pawns on the fifth rank. 17...cxd5 18.exd5 f5 19.d6 19.Qxb4 would allow Black to complicate with 19...Rb8 20.Qa3 e4 with an obscure position. 19...Qc6 20.Bb5!! Another sacrifice in order to stop Black from establishing a successful blockade.

Position: a8 black rook, c8 black bishop, e8 black king, f8 black knight, h8 black rook, g7 black bishop, a6 black pawn, c6 black queen, d6 white pawn, g6 black pawn, b5 white bishop, c5 white pawn, e5 black pawn, f5 black pawn, h5 black knight, a4 white pawn, b4 black pawn, h4 black pawn, e3 white bishop, f3 white pawn, b2 white pawn, d2 white queen, f2 white knight, g2 white pawn, h2 white pawn, a1 white rook, f1 white rook, g1 white king

Position after 20.Bb5!!

20...axb5 21.axb5 Qxb5 Black returns some material in order to blockade White's pawn. White would be winning after 21...Qb7 22.c6 Rxa1 23.cxb7 Rxf1+ 24.Kxf1 Bxb7 25.Nd3 Nd7 26.Qc2 e4 27.Qc7, or 22...Qb8 23.b6 Rxa1 24.Rxa1 Bd7 25.Qd5! Nf6 26.c7. 22.Rxa8 Qc6 23.Rfa1! f4 24.R1a7! Nd7 Not 24...fxe3? 25.Qd5! Qxd5 26.Rxc8#. Now Black threatens to get his king to safety by castling, so White sacrifices more material.

Position: a8 white rook, c8 black bishop, e8 black king, h8 black rook, a7 white rook, d7 black knight, g7 black bishop, c6 black queen, d6 white pawn, g6 black pawn, c5 white pawn, e5 black pawn, h5 black knight, b4 black pawn, f4 black pawn, h4 black pawn, e3 white bishop, f3 white pawn, b2 white pawn, d2 white queen, f2 white knight, g2 white pawn, h2 white pawn, g1 white king

Position after 24...Nd7

25.Rxc8+!! Qxc8 26.Qd5! fxe3 27.Qe6+ Kf8 28.Rxd7! exf2+ 29.Kf1 Qe8

Position: e8 black queen, f8 black king, h8 black rook, d7 white rook, g7 black bishop, d6 white pawn, e6 white queen, g6 black pawn, c5 white pawn, e5 black pawn, h5 black knight, b4 black pawn, h4 black pawn, f3 white pawn, b2 white pawn, f2 black pawn, g2 white pawn, h2 white pawn, f1 white king

Position after 29...Qe8

30.Rf7+! Yet another sacrifice to allow White's d-pawn to promote. After 30.Qxe8+? Kxe8 31.Re7+ Kf8 32.c6 Ng3+! 33.Kxf2 Nf5, White cannot advance his passed pawns. 30... Qxf7 31.Qc8+ Qe8 32.d7 Kf7 33.dxe8=Q+ Rxe8 34.Qb7+ Re7 35.c6! e4! 36.c7 e3 37.Qd5+ Kf6 38.Qd6+ Kf7 39.Qd5+ Kf6 40.Qd6+ Kf7 41.Qxe7+ Kxe7 42.c8=Q Bh6 43.Qc5+ Ke8 44.Qb5+ Kd8 45.Qb6+ Kd7 46.Qxg6 e2+ 47.Kxf2 Be3+! 48.Ke1! 1–0 Notes based on those by Christiansen, Serper, and Seirawan.
