= Eugène Sémérie =

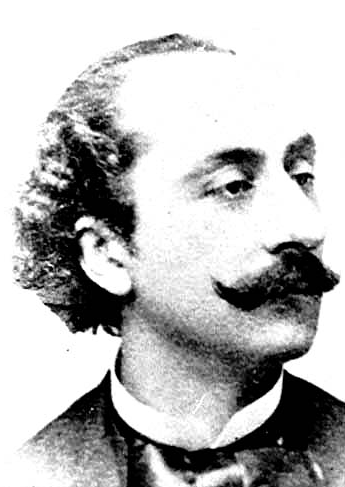
Eugène Sémérie

Eugène Sémérie (6 January 1832 in Aix-en-Provence – 3 May 1884 in Grasse) was a French medical doctor and writer involved with the positive movement.

In 1870 Sémérie was one of the founders of the Positivist Club, which was set up following the proclamation of the French Third Republic on 4 September 1870.

== Works ==
- Des symptômes intellectuels de la folie / Paris : A. Delahaye, 1867
- République occidentale ordre et progrès : Fondation d'un club positiviste / Paris : impr. de Jouaust, 1870
- La République et le peuple souverain : mémoire lu au club positiviste de Paris dans sa séance du lundi 3 avril 1871 / Paris : A. Lacroix, Verboeckoven and co., 1871
- Positivistes et catholiques (2nd edition) with a new preface, Ernest Leroux éditeur, Avril 1873
- La grande crise 1789-1871, Neuchatel: Impr. de L.-A. Borel 1874
- Théologie et science : simple réponse à M. Dupanloup, évêque d'Orléans / 4e éd. / Paris : E. Leroux, 1875
- Des symptômes intellectuels de la folie / (2nd edition) / Paris : E. Leroux, 1875
- La loi des trois états : réponse à M. Renouvier, directeur de la Critique philosophique / Paris : E. Leroux, 1875
- Des Sources biologiques de la notion d'humanité, Vichy: Impr. de Wallon, 1883
- Des hallucinations de la musculation : la conquête du microbe / Vichy : impr. de Wallon, 1883
