= Agroecius (bishop of Antibes) =

6th-century bishop of Antibes

Agroecius was a 6th-century bishop of Antibes, and the addressee of one of the extant letters of the ecclesiastic Caesarius of Arles.

As one of the most senior bishops in the province, he was the subject of some discussion at the Council of Carpentras in 527, as it was said he had ordained a cleric named Protadius who had not first undergone the required year of probation (conversus) as dictated by the Council of Arles (524). Agroecius did not attend the council, but was defended by the priest Catafronius in his stead. Nevertheless, it was determined that he should be censured, and he was forbidden from saying mass for one year. Although Catafronius agreed to the terms of this punishment, Agroecius apparently ignored them and continued to say mass. As he felt his authority flouted, Caesarius appealed to Pope Felix IV, who issued an edict reconfirming the requirement of the probationary period. Whether Agroecius paid any attention to this is unknown, although he did not appear at any of the subsequent church councils, and by the Fourth Council of Orléans in 541, Agroecius was no longer bishop of Antibes.
