= Galimard =

Perfume company

Galimard logo

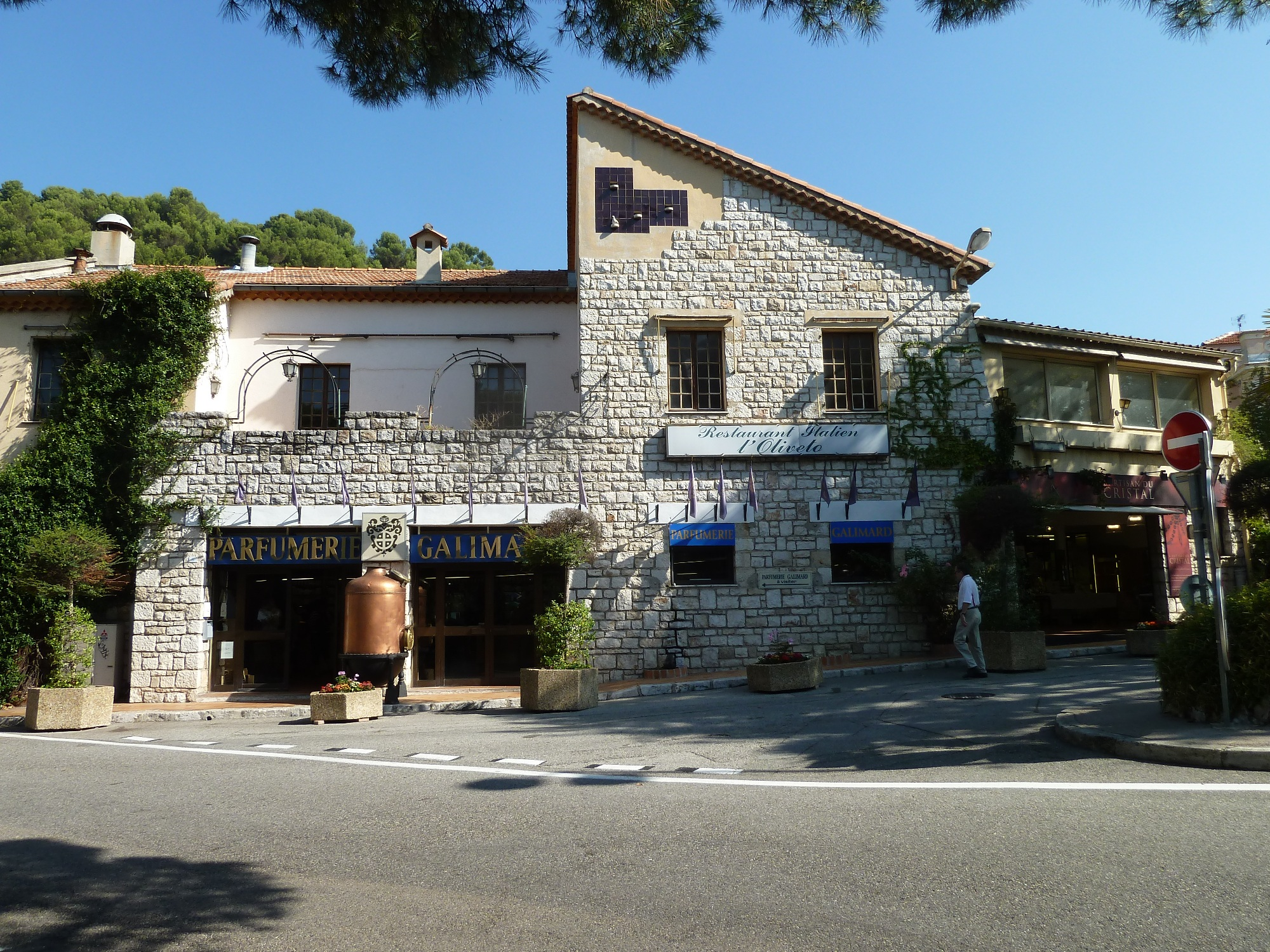
Galimard in Eze

Galimard is a French perfume manufacture based in Grasse founded by Joseph Roux in 1950. The name of the manufacture is a tribute to Jean de Galimard.

== History ==
In 1747 Jean de Galimard, Lord of Seranon was a perfumer in Grasse. Galimard was the purveyor to the court of the King of France Louis XV.
