= Grasse Cathedral =

Cathedral in Alpes-Maritimes, France

Grasse Cathedral Cathédrale Notre-Dame-du-Puy de Grasse
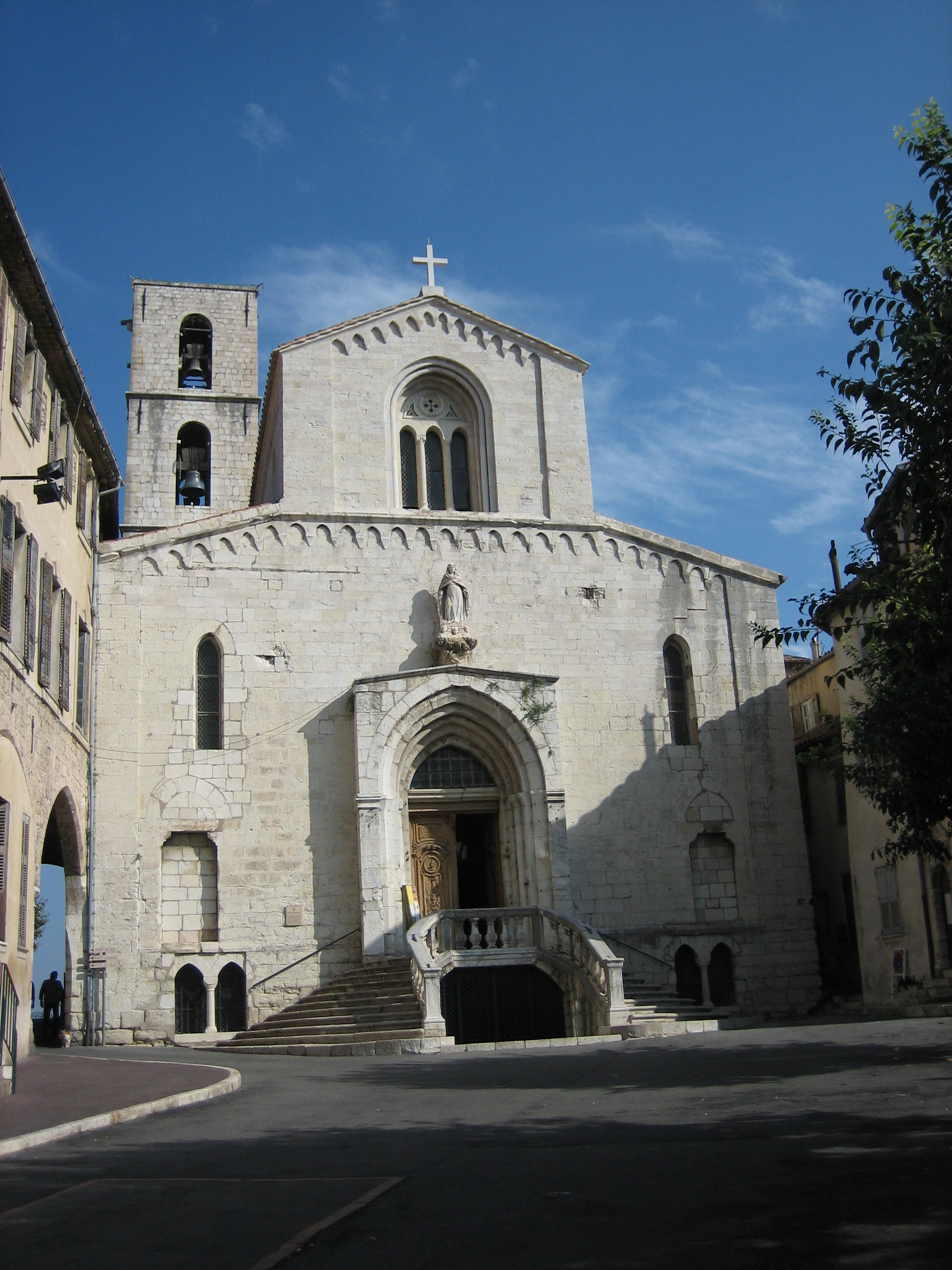
- Grasse Cathedral

Religion
- Affiliation: Roman Catholic Church
- Province: Bishop of Grasse
- Region: Alpes-Maritimes
- Rite: Roman
- Ecclesiastical or organisational status: Cathedral
- Status: Active

Location
- Location: Grasse, France
- Interactive map of Grasse Cathedral; Cathédrale Notre-Dame-du-Puy de Grasse
- Coordinates: 43°39′28.3″N 6°55′29″E

Architecture
- Type: church
- Style: Romanesque

Grasse Cathedral, now the Church of Notre-Dame-du-Puy (French: Cathédrale Notre-Dame-du-Puy de Grasse), is a 12th-century Roman Catholic church located in Grasse, Alpes-Maritimes, France. The former cathedral is in the Romanesque architectural style, and is a national monument.

As a cathedral it was the seat of the Bishop of Grasse. The diocese of Grasse was abolished under the Concordat of 1801 and since then the building has been a parish church.

== Sources ==
- Jacques Thirion: Romanik der Côte d'Azur und der Seealpen, pp. 211–221. Echter Verlag: Würzburg ISBN 3429009111
