= Roman Catholic Diocese of Grasse =

Former Catholic Diocese

Coordinates: 43.6579°N 6.9247°E

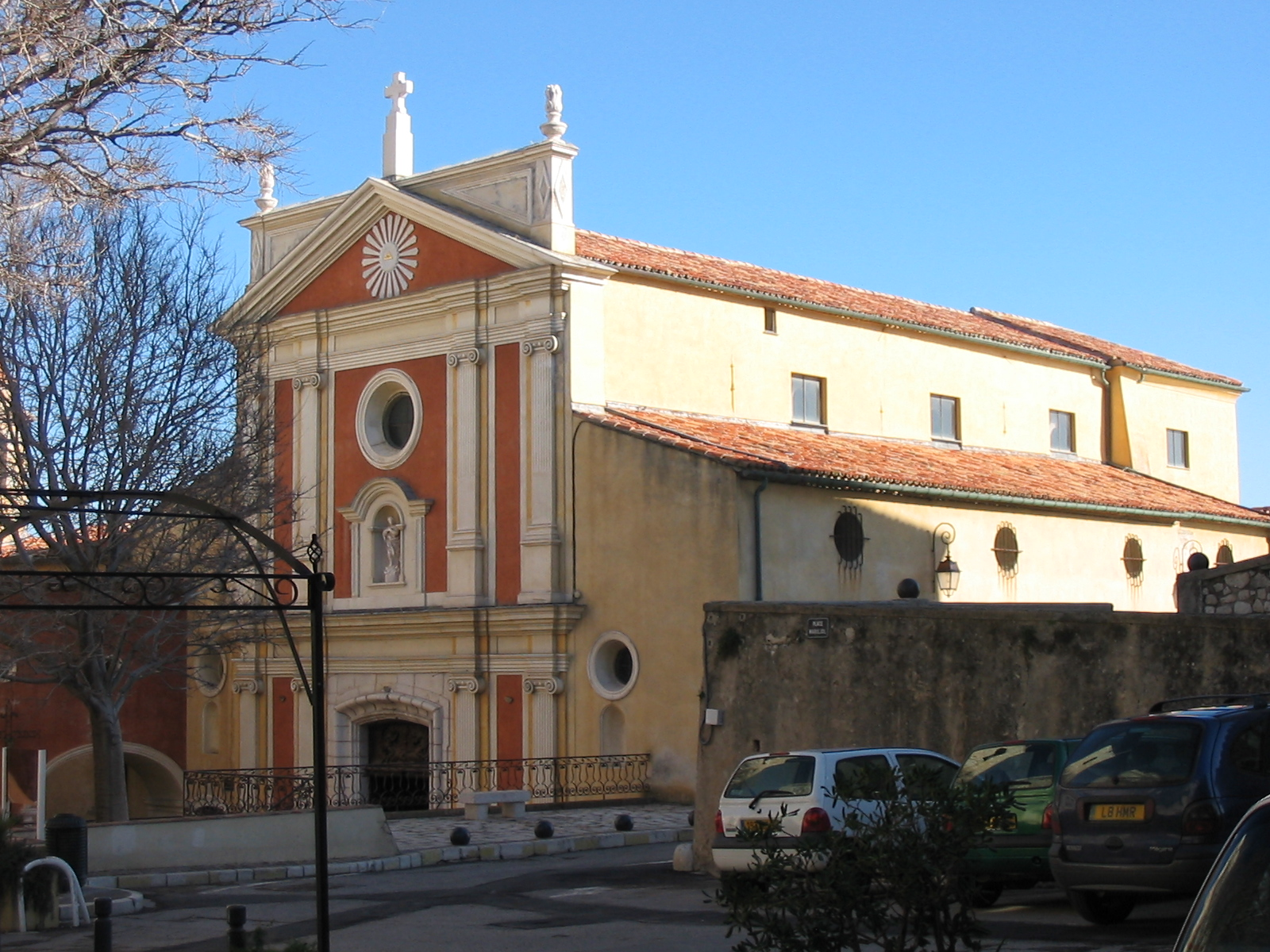
Cathedral of Antibes (Notre-Dame-de-la-Platea)

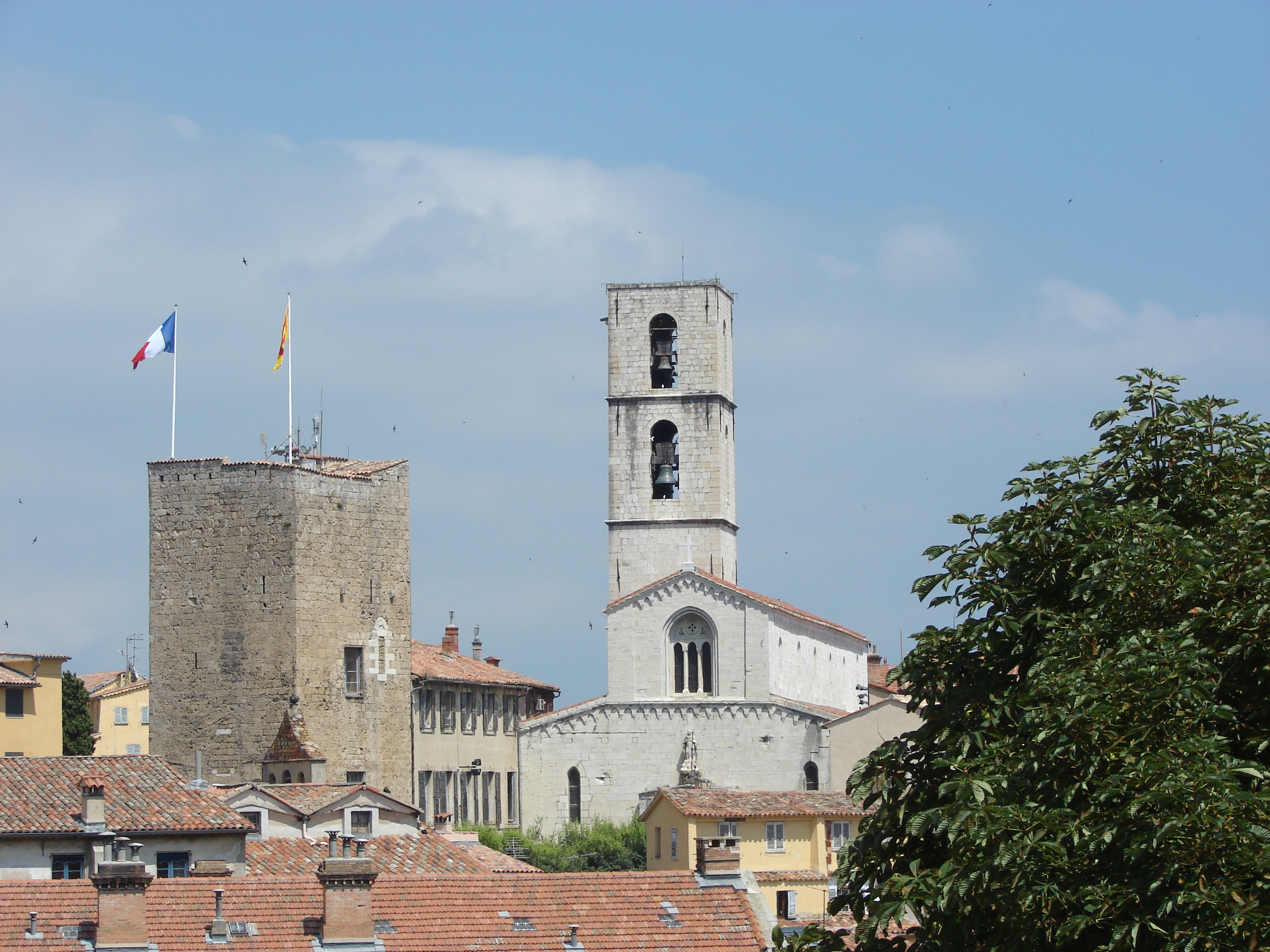
Grasse Cathedral (Notre-Dame-du-Puy)

The former French Catholic diocese of Grasse was founded in the 4th or 5th century as the diocese of Antibes. It was originally suffragan to the archbishop of Aix, and then to the archbishop of Embrun. The see moved from Antibes to Grasse in 1244. It remained at Grasse Cathedral until the French Revolution. The diocese was suppressed by the Concordat of 1801, its territory passing to the diocese of Nice.

== History ==
The city of Antibes was a colony of the Greek city of Massilia (Marseille). The Romans included it in the Alpes Maritimae. In church organization, Antibes belonged to the province of Alpes Maritimae, whose metropolitan was the archbishop of Aix. Its metropolitan later, before 1056, became the archbishop of Embrun.

The first known bishop of Antibes is Armentarius who attended the Council of Vaison in 442.

Louis Duchesne considered it possible that the Remigius, who signed at the Council of Nîmes in 396 and in 417 received a letter from Pope Zosimus, may have been bishop of Antibes before Armentarius. Ralph Matheson, however, believes that this Remigius was Remigius of Aix.

On 19 July 1244, Pope Innocent IV transferred the seat of the diocese from the port city of Antibes to the interior city of Grasse, due to a depopulation of Antibes and the repeated attacks of pirates, propter insalubritatem aeris et incursus piratorum.

In 1181, King Alfonso II of Aragon granted Bishop Fulco of Antibes the seigneurial rights over the city of Antibes.

The cathedral of Grasse was dedicated to the Virgin Mary, and was supervised by a chapter composed of (originally) five dignities (provost, sacristan, archdeacon, 'capiscolo' [scholasticus] and archpriest) and four canons (one of whom was designated the Theologus). The office of provost, however, was abolished on 30 July 1692. The office of archdeacon of Grasse was established by Bishop Bernardo de Castronovo on 16 May 1421.

The diocese of Grasse was suppressed by decree of the Legislative Assembly of France on 22 November 1790.

The arrondissement of Grasse was separated from the diocese of Fréjus in 1886, and given to the bishopric of Nice which since unites the three former dioceses of Nice, Grasse and Vence.

== Bishops of Antibes ==
- c. 442: Armentarius
- c. 506–c. 529: Agroecius
- c. 529–541: Eucherius
- 549 – 570 x 573: Eusebius
- c. 573 – c. 585: Optatus
- 614: Eusebius
- c. 647–653: Deocarus
- 788: Autbertus
- [828: Heldebonus]
- [930: Aimarus]
- c. 987 – 1022: Bernardus (I.)
- 1026 – c. 1050: Heldebertus (I.)
- 1056 – c. 1088: Gaufredus (I.)
- 1089 – 1093: Aldebertus (or Adelbertus II.)
- c. 1110 – c. 1135: Manfredus Grimaldi
- 1143: Gaufredus (II.)
- 1146–1156: Petrus
- 1158–ca. 1165: Raimond (I.)
- 1166–1177: Bertrandus (I.)
- 1178–1185: Fulco
- 1186–1187: Guillaume (I.)
- 1188–c. 1195: Raimond (II.) Grimaldi
- 1199: Olivier
- c. 1208–c. 1211: Bertrandus (II.)
- c. 1212–c. 1215: Guillaume (Gausselin) de Saint-Marcel
- 1218–1245?: Bertrand d'Aix, O.P.

== Bishops of Grasse ==
=== from 1245 to 1505 ===
- 1246–1253 Raimond (III.) Villeneuve, O.P.
- c. 1255 Pontius
- 1258–1277 Guilelmus de Barras
- c. 1281 – 1286 Pons d'Arcussia
- 1287–1298 Lantelmus de Saint-Marcel
- 1298–1299 Guillaume Agarni
- 1299–1343 Geoffroy (III.)
- 1343–1348 Pierre de Béreste
- 1348–1349 Jean Coci (Peyroleri)
- 1349–1374 Amédée
- 1374–1379 Aimar de La Voulte
- 1379–1382 Artaud de Mélan
- 1383–1388 Thomas de Jarente (Avignon Obedience)
- Mar–Oct 1389 Milon Provana, O.Min. (Avignon Obedience)
- 9 Oct 1389 – 1392 Jacques Graillier
- 29 February 1392 – 1407 Pierre Bonnet (Avignon Obedience)
- 1408–1427 Bernard de Châteauneuf de Paule
- 1427–1447 Antoine de Roumoules
- 1448–1450 Guillaume Guezi
- 1450–1451 Pierre de Forbin (Gorbin)

1450 Dominique de Guiza

- 1451–1483 Isnard de Grasse
- 1483–1505 Jean-André Grimaldi

=== from 1505 to 1791 ===
- 1505–1532 Augustine Grimaldi
- 1532–1533 René du Bellay
- 1534–1536 Benoit Théocréne
- 8 Jan 1537 – 18 March 1548 Agostino Trivulzio (Administrator)
- 1551–1565 Jean Vallier
- 1567–1570 Jean Grenon
- 1570–1588 Étienne Déodel

1588–1598 Georges de Poissieux

- 1592–1601 Guillaume Le Blanc
- 1604–1624 Étienne Le Maingre de Boucicault, O.F.M.Obs.
- 1625–1628 Jean de Grasse-Cabris
- 1630–1632 Jean Guérin
- 1632–1636 Scipion de Villeneuve-Thorenc
- 1636–1653 Antoine Godeau
- 1653–1675 Louis de Bernage
- 1676–1681 Louis Aube de Roquemartine
- 1682–1683 Antoine Le Comte

[François Verjus]
[Jean Balthazar de Cabanes]

- 1692–1710 François Verjus
- 1711–1726 Joseph de Mesgrigny, O.F.M. Cap.
- 1726–1752 Charles-Octavien d'Anthelmy
- 1752–1797 François d'Estienne de Saint-Jean de Prunières

== See also ==
- Catholic Church in France
- List of Catholic dioceses in France

== Bibliography ==
=== Reference works ===
- Gams, Pius Bonifatius (1873). Series episcoporum Ecclesiae catholicae: quotquot innotuerunt a beato Petro apostolo. Ratisbon: Typis et Sumptibus Georgii Josephi Manz. (Use with caution; obsolete)
- Eubel, Conradus, ed. (1913). Hierarchia catholica, Tomus 1 (second ed.). Münster: Libreria Regensbergiana. (in Latin)
- Eubel, Conradus, ed. (1914). Hierarchia catholica, Tomus 2 (second ed.). Münster: Libreria Regensbergiana. (in Latin)
- Gulik, Guilelmus (1923). Eubel, Conradus (ed.). Hierarchia catholica, Tomus 3 (second ed.). Münster: Libreria Regensbergiana.
- Gauchat, Patritius (Patrice) (1935). Hierarchia catholica IV (1592-1667). Münster: Libraria Regensbergiana.
- Ritzler, Remigius; Sefrin, Pirminus (1952). Hierarchia catholica medii et recentis aevi V (1667-1730). Patavii: Messagero di S. Antonio.
- Ritzler, Remigius; Sefrin, Pirminus (1958). Hierarchia catholica medii et recentis aevi VI (1730-1799). Patavii: Messagero di S. Antonio.

=== Studies ===
- Aubert, Alexandre (1869). Histoire civile et religieuse d'Antibes (in French). Antibes: Marchand.
- Bianchi, Constant. "L'application de la Constitution civile du clergé dans l'ancien diocèse de Grasse," Annales de la Société scientifique et littéraire de Cannes, 13 (1951–54), pp. 97–108.
- Duchesne, Louis (1907). Fastes épiscopaux de l'ancienne Gaule: I. Provinces du Sid-Est (second ed.). Paris: Fontemoing. pp. 288-289.
- Doublet, Georges (1907). L'ancienne cathédrale de Grasse (in French). Vol. première partie. Nice: Impr. réunies Malvano et aux arts et métiers.
- Doublet, Georges (1915). Recueil des actes concernant les évêques d'Antibes (in French and Latin). Paris: Picard. Downloadable from HathiTrust.
- Du Tems, Hugues (1775). Le clergé de France (in French). Vol. Tome IV. Brunet. pp. 288–307.
- Jean, Armand (1891). Les évêques et les archevêques de France depuis 1682 jusqu'à 1801 (in French). Paris: A. Picard. p. 78.
- Moris, Henri; Blanc, Edmond (1883). Cartulaire de L'abbaye de Lérins (in French and Latin). Vol. première partie. Paris: H. Champion. ISBN 978-5-87682-826-2.
- Moris, Henri (1905). Cartulaire de L'abbaye de Lérins (in French and Latin). Vol. deuxième partie. Paris: H. Champion. ISBN 978-5-87682-827-9.
- Sainte-Marthe, Denis de (1725). Gallia Christiana, in Provincias Ecclesiasticas Distributa (in Latin). Vol. Tomus Tertius (3). Paris: Ex Typographia Regia. pp. 1146–1211, Instrumenta, pp. 190–194 and 210–234.
- Tisserand, Eugène (1876). Histoire d'Antibes (in French). Antibes: J. Marchand.
- Recueil des historiens de la France: Pouillés (in French and Latin). Vol. Tome VIII. Paris: Imprimerie Nationale. 1923.
