= Enfleurage =

Capturing plant fragrances for perfumery

Enfleurage is a process that uses odorless fats that are solid at room temperature to capture the fragrant compounds, such as volatile oils, produced by plants. The technique is largely obsolete. The process can be cold or hot enfleurage. The method was established in the 17th–18th centuries in connection with the development of the perfume craft in the French city of Grasse. Enfleurage is one of a host of solvent extraction techniques in the perfume and aroma industries.

== Process ==
There are two types of enfleurage:

- In cold enfleurage, a large framed glass plate, called a chassis, is smeared with a layer of animal fat, usually lard (from pork) or tallow (from beef), and allowed to set. Botanical matter, usually petals or whole flowers, is then placed on the fat and its scent is allowed to diffuse into the fat over the course of 1–3 days. The process is then repeated by replacing the spent botanicals with fresh ones until the fat has reached a desired degree of fragrance saturation. This procedure was developed in southern France in the 18th century for the production of high-grade concentrates.
- In hot enfleurage, solid fats are heated and botanical matter is stirred into the fat. Spent botanicals are repeatedly strained from the fat and replaced with fresh material until the fat is saturated with fragrance. This method is considered the oldest-known procedure for preserving plant fragrance substances.

=== Downstream and related extraction processes ===
In hot and cold enfleurage, the fat containing the fragrance is called enfleurage pomade. The pomade was either sold as it was, or it could be further washed or soaked in ethyl alcohol to draw the fragrant molecules into the alcohol. The alcohol was then separated from the fat and waxes, and allowed to evaporate, leaving behind the absolute of the botanical matter. The spent fat is usually used to make soaps since it is still relatively fragrant.

Instead of hot/cold enfleurage, the plant material can also be extracted with nonpolar hydrocarbons such as toluene or hexane to give a "concrete." Concretes, which per se are rarely useful, contain fats, waxes, and essential oils. Extraction of these concretes with ethanol again gives an absolute, free of waxes and fats. Absolutes can be also obtained by direct extraction of the plant material with ethanol.

When plant exudates such as rosin are extracted with organic solvents, one obtains "resinoids.” They are used as fixatives. With regards to the area of essential oils, these techniques all consist of extraction, whereas a traditional route to obtain essential oils is by steam distillation.

=== Historic context ===
The enfleurage method is one of the oldest. It is also highly inefficient and costly but was the sole method of extracting the fragrant compounds in delicate flowers such as jasmine and tuberose, which would be destroyed or denatured by the high temperatures required by other methods of fragrance extraction such as steam distillation. The method is now superseded by more efficient techniques such as solvent extraction or supercritical fluid extraction using supercritical carbon dioxide (CO_{2}) or similar compressed gases.
