= Lautier =

Lautier (French pronunciation: [lotje]) is a French surname that may refer to the following notable people:

- Claire Lautier, American actress
- Joël Lautier (born 1973), French chess grandmaster
- Louis Lautier (1897–1962), American journalist
