= Absolute (perfumery) =

Aromatic plant extract used in perfume

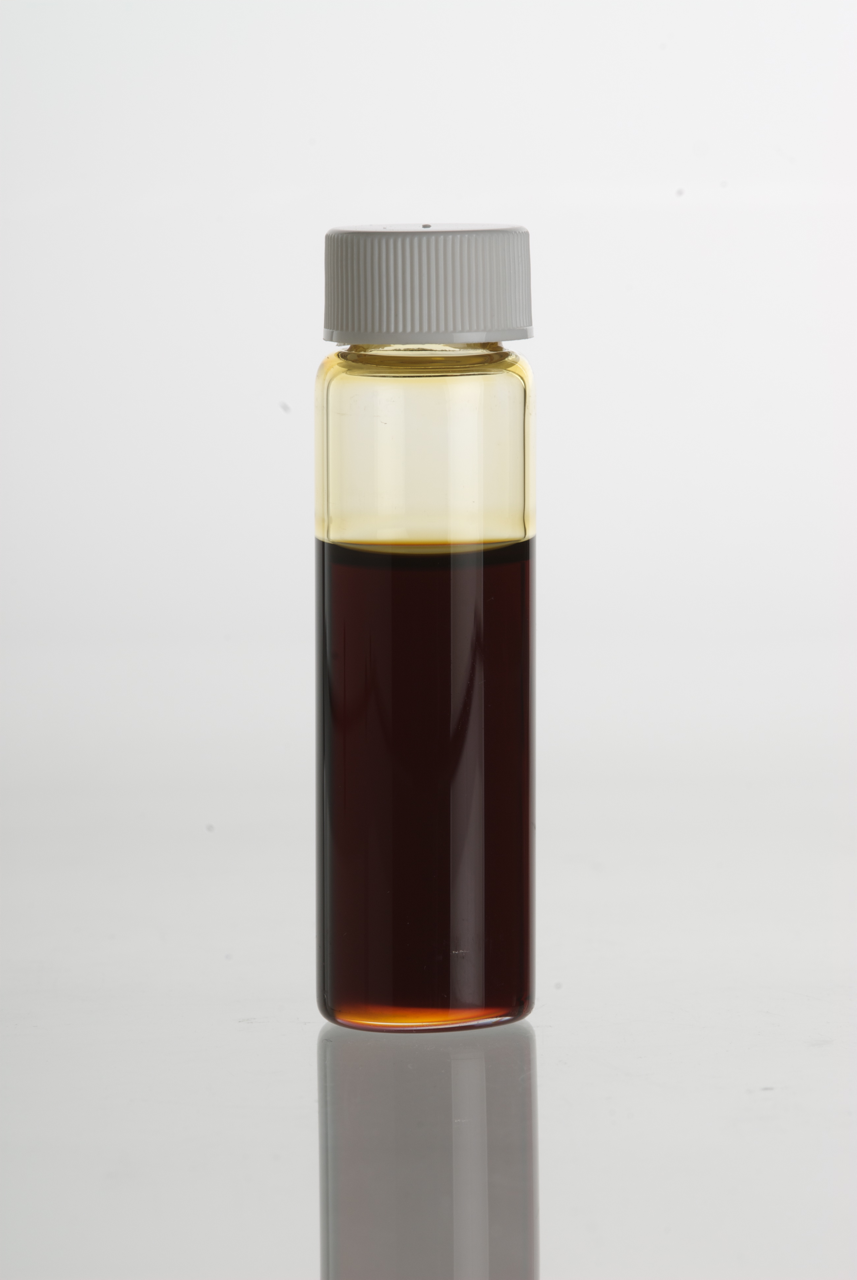
Jasmine (Jasminum officinale) absolute

Used in perfumery and aromatherapy, absolutes are similar to essential oils, but having a higher concentration (up to 80–90% of aromatic substances) and lower volatility. They are concentrated, highly aromatic, oily mixtures extracted from plants. Whereas essential oils are produced by distillation, boiling, or pressing, absolutes are produced through solvent extraction, or more traditionally, through enfleurage.

== Production ==
First, plant material is extracted with a hydrocarbon solvent, such as hexane, to yield concrete. The concrete is then extracted with ethanol. The ethanol extract is cooled (e.g., to −15 °C) to solidify waxes, and cold filtered to yield a liquid extract. When the ethanol evaporates, an oil—the absolute—is left behind.

Traditionally, the absolute was obtained by enfleurage, where the resulting pomade was extracted with ethanol to yield the absolute.

== Character and use ==
Some raw materials are either too delicate or too inert to be steam-distilled and can only yield their aroma through solvent extraction. Examples of these are jasmine and beeswax. Absolutes in demand include rose, jasmine, tuberose, jonquil, ylang-ylang, mimosa, boronia, lavender, lavandin, geranium, clary sage, violet, oakmoss, tonka bean.

Rose oil, jasmine absolute, tuberose absolute, tobacco absolute, orris root oil, ambrette seeds oil, angelica root oil, and orange flower oil are valuable and expensive fragrance and flavor ingredients.

Residual solvents may remain in the absolutes. Therefore, some absolutes are considered undesirable for aromatherapy.

== See also ==
- Balsam
- Concrete
- Enfleurage
- Extract
- Oleogumresin
- Oleoresin
- Pommade
- Resinoid
- Tincture
