= Concrete (perfumery) =

Term in fragrance extraction for the mass remaining after solvent extraction

Concrete, in perfumery, is a waxy mass obtained by solvent extraction of fresh plant material. It is usually used for the production of absolutes.

== Sources ==
Concretes are produced from natural plant materials, mainly flowers. Some of the most popular natural flowers used are rose and lavender.

== Production ==
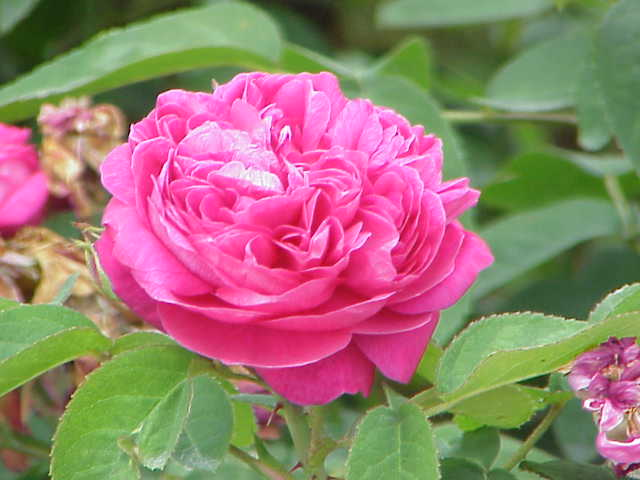
An image of a Damask rose. This aromatic species of rose is used for producing rose concrete to be made into a rose absolute. Rose is one of the most popular natural flowers used in perfumery.

A semi-solid residue of essential oils, waxes, resins and other oil-soluble plant chemicals remains.

The solvent used for extraction must be chosen carefully regarding its polarity and boiling point. If the boiling point is too high, compounds that are readily deactivated by heat might be destroyed, leading to a loss of certain fragrance ingredients during evaporation.

The resulting residue after evaporation consists mostly of heavier nonvolatile substances, which give concrete its "waxy" properties.

Putting the plant materials under high pressure before treating it with solvents has been found to greatly increase the yield of the concrete. This is because high pressure causes the cells to burst, which allows the glucoside and diastase in the plants to react more freely.

== Applications ==
The main use of concrete is for producing absolutes. The general process of producing absolutes includes extracting the concrete with ethanol, using cold filtration to remove residue, then distilling off the ethanol.

Absolutes are highly concentrated and aromatic oily mixtures. They are similar to essential oils, but are more soluble and have longer lasting odours. Absolutes are completely soluble in ethanol and can be used as perfume ingredients. In contrast to this, concretes are only partially soluble in ethanol due its composition of heavier substances. Therefore, they cannot directly produce perfume without being made into an absolute first. Because of their insoluble character, they are also used in soap perfumery.

== Issues ==
The first issue with using concretes in perfumery is that their extracts can become rancid after several months, especially if the containers are exposed to strong light.

The second issue is regarding residual pesticides in concretes. Cultivation of natural raw materials for producing concretes is often done by using monoculture techniques that use pesticides. The international regulation of pesticides in use for natural raw materials is not consistent yet. In Europe, the Regulation no. 396/2005/CE and Regulation no. 1107/2009 of the European Parliament and the European Council set a target maximum pesticide residue limit as 0.01 mg kg^{−1}. However, currently, there is no universal method for analyzing the amount of residual pesticides in concretes that could show if the amount of residual pesticide in a concrete sample is safe. Previous analyses that used gas chromatography were heavily affected by the different components of the complex mixture of concrete samples. Therefore, it is likely that their analyses of the amount of pesticide in concrete was inaccurate. This is a concern, as a level of pesticide in concrete that is above the safe limit could lead to health risks.
