= Port Vauban =

Port in Antibes, France

Coordinates: 43°35′12″N 7°7′37″E

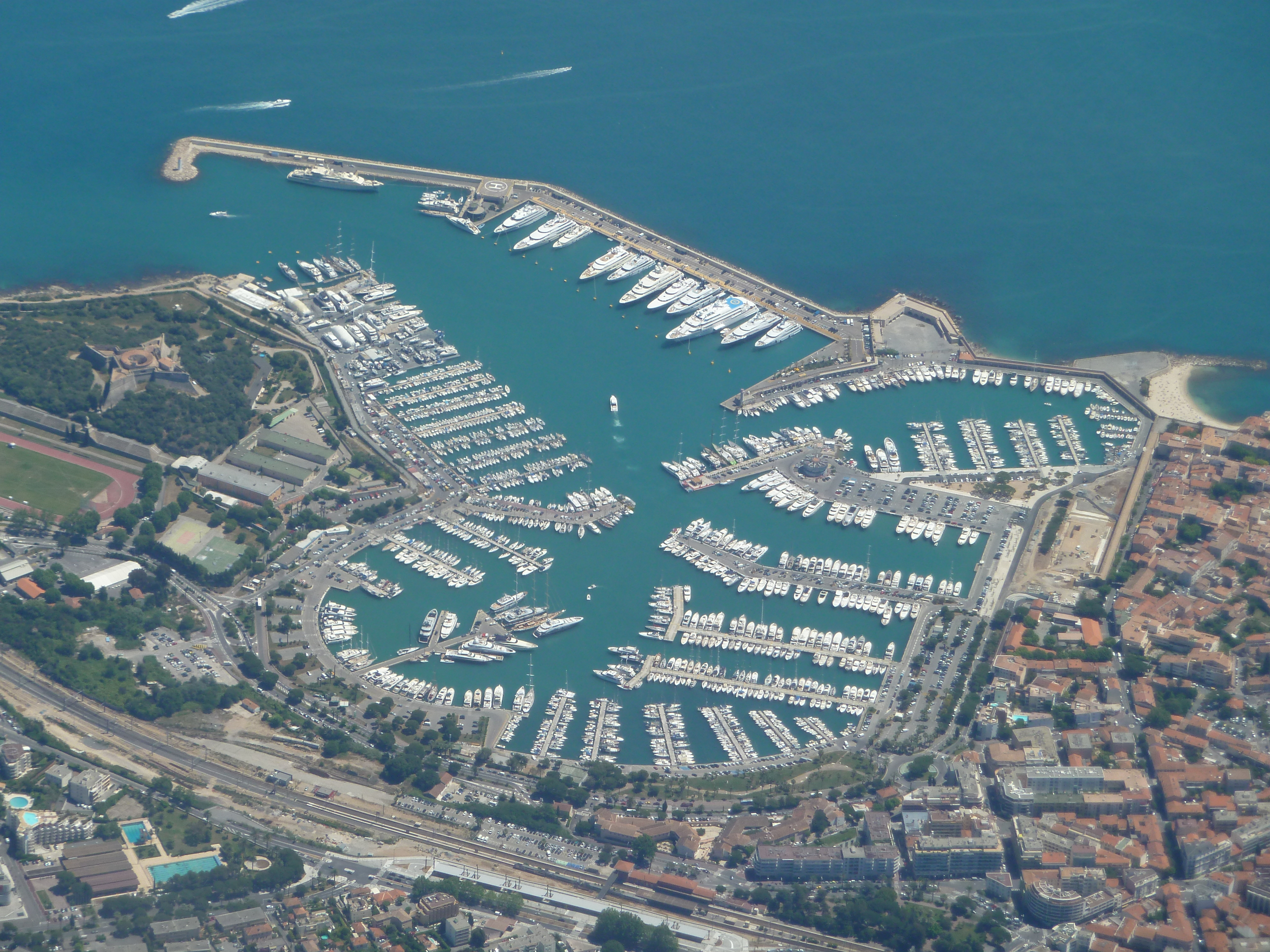
Aerial view of the port of Antibes

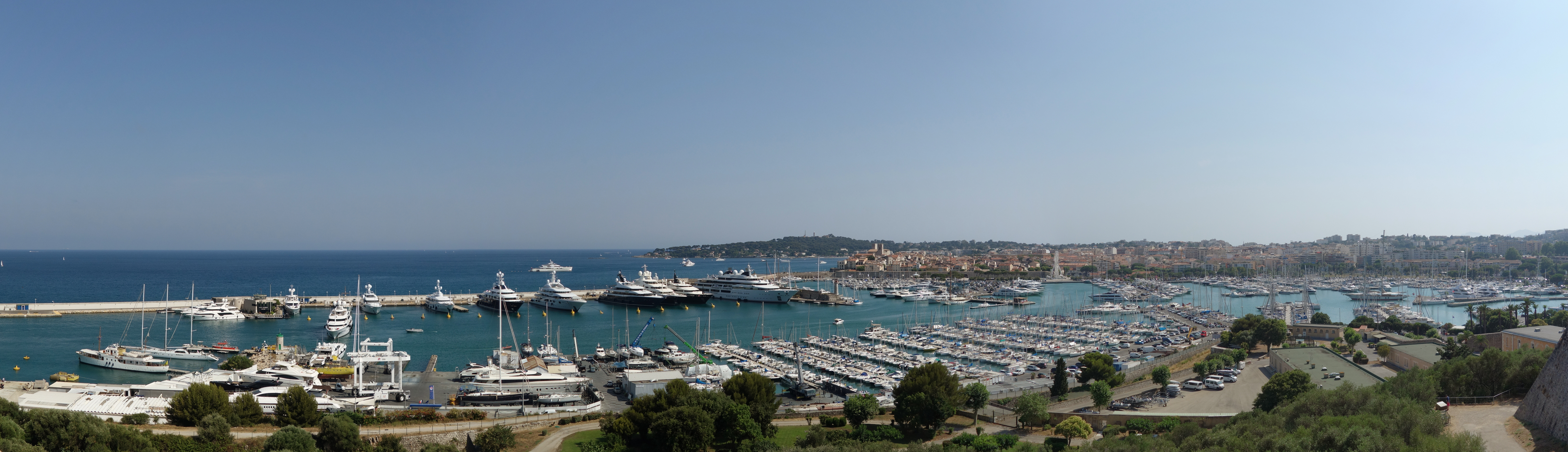
Port Vauban from the Fort Carré, with the Antibes city on the right and the quai des milliardaires on the left.

Port Vauban is a French yachting harbor located in Antibes on the French Riviera. Originally a natural harbor in use since before the Roman Empire, the port was fortified by Sébastien Le Prestre, Seigneur de Vauban, later Marquis de Vauban, King Louis XIV's military engineer.

Port Vauban now serves as the home of the Yacht Club d'Antibes and is the largest marina (in terms of total tonnage of the boats and yachts moored there) in the Mediterranean Sea. Some of the world's largest and most lavishly appointed yachts have Port Vauban as their home port, including Russian oil businessman Roman Abramovich's 86 m Ecstasea and his gift to fellow Russian businessman Eugene Shvidler (Le Grand Bleu). Co-founder of Microsoft Paul Allen's yacht Octopus is a regular visitor to the harbor.

In the early part of the 20th century, Port Vauban also accommodated numerous seaplanes and a seaplane manufacturer.

As of 2012, typical rates for a berth in Port Vauban are between €1m to €1.4m.
