= Hôtel de Ville, Antibes =

Town hall in Antibes, France

Hôtel de Ville
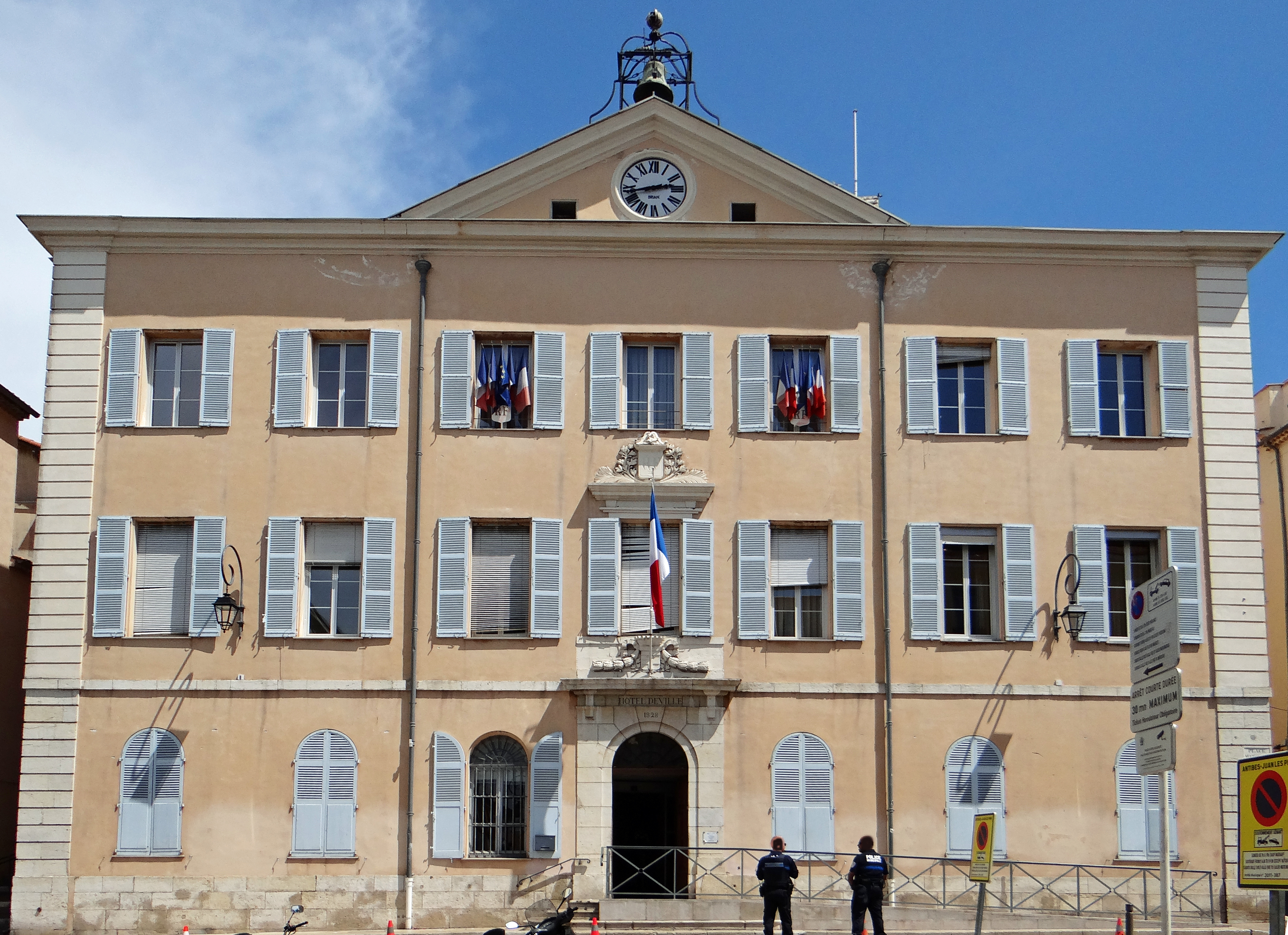
- The main frontage of the Hôtel de Ville in May 2016
- Interactive map of the Hôtel de Ville area

General information
- Type: City hall
- Architectural style: Neoclassical style
- Location: Antibes, France
- Coordinates: 43.5813°N 7.1279°E
- Completed: 1828

Design and construction
- Architect: Jacques Quine

The Hôtel de Ville (French pronunciation: [otɛl də vil], City Hall) is a municipal building in Antibes, Alpes-Maritimes, southern France, standing on Cours Masséna.

== History ==
The first town hall in Antibes was the Château Grimaldi, which was originally built in the late fourteenth century as the residence of the town's feudal lords Marc and Luc Grimaldi, scions of the famous Grimaldi Dynasty. The château was seized by the revolutionary authorities during the French Revolution and was converted for use as a town hall.

In the early 1820s, the local military authorities decided that they needed the château for use as barracks. Civic leaders therefore decided to commission a purpose-built town hall. The area they selected, in the old town, was occupied by one of the medieval gates of the city, the Tour de l'Horloge, which dated from 1516.

Initially, an architect from Var was asked to draw up plans, but these were rejected. The final drawings were prepared by Jacques Quine. The new town hall was designed in the neoclassical style, built in brick with a cement render and was completed in 1828.

The design involved a symmetrical main frontage of seven bays facing onto Cours Masséna. The central bay contained a rounded-headed doorway with a rusticated surround. The date "1828" was inscribed into the keystone and the doorway was flanked by brackets supporting a cornice and a heraldic shield. The other bays on the ground floor were fenestrated with round-headed windows with shutters while the bays on the first and second floors were fenestrated with square-headed windows with shutters. At roof level, there was a pediment with a clock in the tympanum above the central three bays. Internally, the principal room was the Salle du Conseil (council chamber).

In 1988, the ancient city archives, which had been preserved in the Château Grimaldi, and the newer archives, which had been kept in the town hall, were brought together to form a single collection in a building in Rue des Casemates. The town hall continued to hold some archaeological artefacts relating to the ancient Greek town of Antipolis.
