= Antibes =

Commune in Provence-Alpes-Côte d'Azur, France

Antibes Antíbol (Occitan)
- Commune
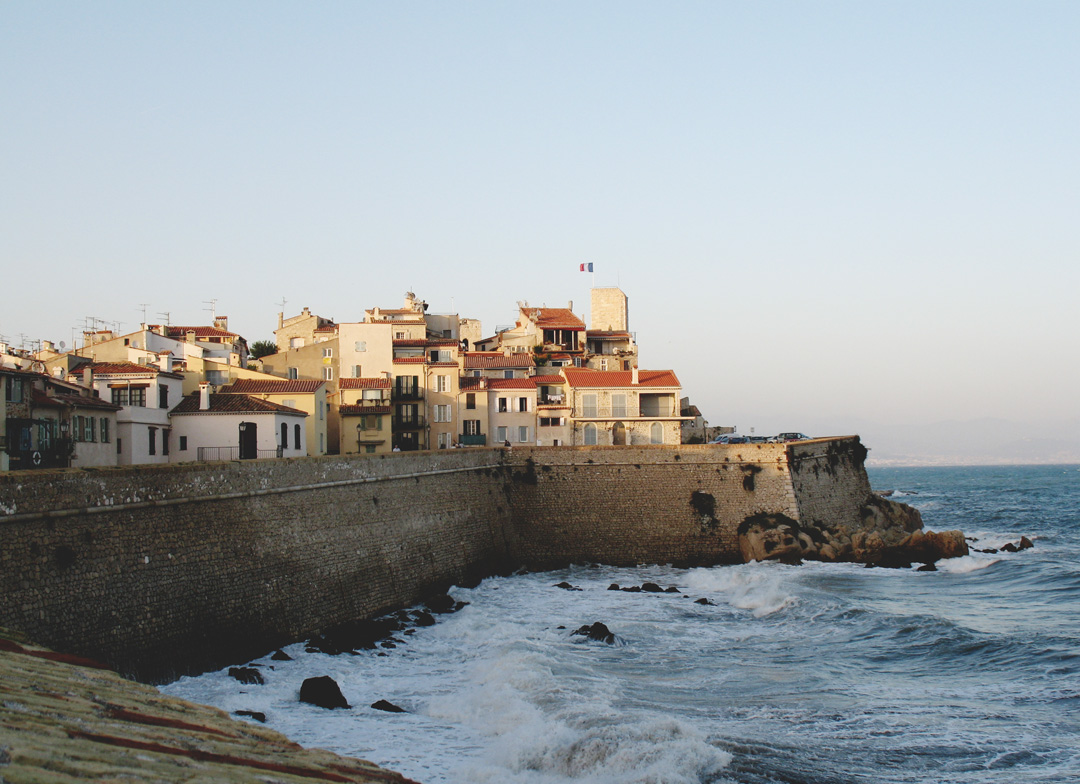
- View of the old city (Vieille Ville) of Antibes by the Mediterranean

- Flag Coat of arms
- Location of Antibes
- Location within France Location within Provence-Alpes-Côte d'Azur
- Coordinates: 43°34′51″N 7°07′26″E
- Country: France
- Region: Provence-Alpes-Côte d'Azur
- Department: Alpes-Maritimes
- Arrondissement: Grasse
- Canton: Antibes-1, 2 and 3
- Intercommunality: Sophia Antipolis

Government
  - Mayor (2026–32): Jean Leonetti (LR)
- Area^{1}: 26.48 km^{2} (10.22 sq mi)
- Elevation: 9 m (30 ft)
- Highest elevation: 163 m (535 ft)
- Lowest elevation: 0 m (0 ft)
- Population (2023): 77,637
  - Density: 2,932/km^{2} (7,594/sq mi)
- Demonym: Antibois
- Time zone: UTC+01:00 (CET)
  - Summer (DST): UTC+02:00 (CEST)
- INSEE/Postal code: 06004 /06600
- Website: www.antibes-juanlespins.com
- ^{1} French Land Register data, which excludes lakes, ponds, glaciers > 1 km^{2} (0.386 sq mi or 247 acres) and river estuaries.

Antibes (/ɒ̃ˈtiːb/, US also /ɑːnˈtiːbz/; French: [ɑ̃tib]; Occitan: Antíbol [anˈtibu]) is a seaside resort city in the Alpes-Maritimes department in Provence-Alpes-Côte d'Azur, Southeastern France. It is located on the French Riviera between Cannes and Nice; it is the largest yachting harbour in Europe. In 2023, the commune had a population of 77,637, making it Alpes-Maritimes's second-most populated after Nice.

Its cape, the Cap d'Antibes, along with Cap Ferrat in Saint-Jean-Cap-Ferrat to the northeast, are two major landforms in the area. The capes house the Hôtel du Cap-Eden-Roc and Grand-Hôtel du Cap-Ferrat respectively, widely considered two of the most exclusive hotels in the world. Culturally, Antibes is home to the Musée Picasso.

The resort town of Juan-les-Pins is in the commune of Antibes; the Sophia Antipolis technology park is northwest of it.

== History ==
=== Origins ===
Traces of occupation dating back to the early Iron Age have been found in the areas of the castle and cathedral. Remains beneath the Holy Spirit Chapel show there was an indigenous community with ties with Mediterranean populations, including the Etruscans, as evidenced by the presence of numerous underwater amphorae and wrecks off Antibes. However, most trade was with the Greek world, via the Phocaeans of Marseille.

=== Greek colony of Marseille ===
Antibes was founded as a Greek colony by Phocaeans from Massalia. They named it Antipolis (Greek: Ἀντίπολις, lit. "Opposite-City") from its position on the opposite side of the Var estuary from Nice (Greek: Νίκαια).

Current research suggests that Antipolis was founded relatively late in classical Greek period (4th century BC), to benefit from the protection of Marseille with its trade routes along the coast and strongholds like Olbia at Hyères, and trading posts such as Antipolis itself and later Nikaia; it is mentioned by Strabo.

The exact location of the Greek city is not well known. Given Greek colonial practices, it is likely that it was set at the foot of the rock of Antibes, in today's old city.

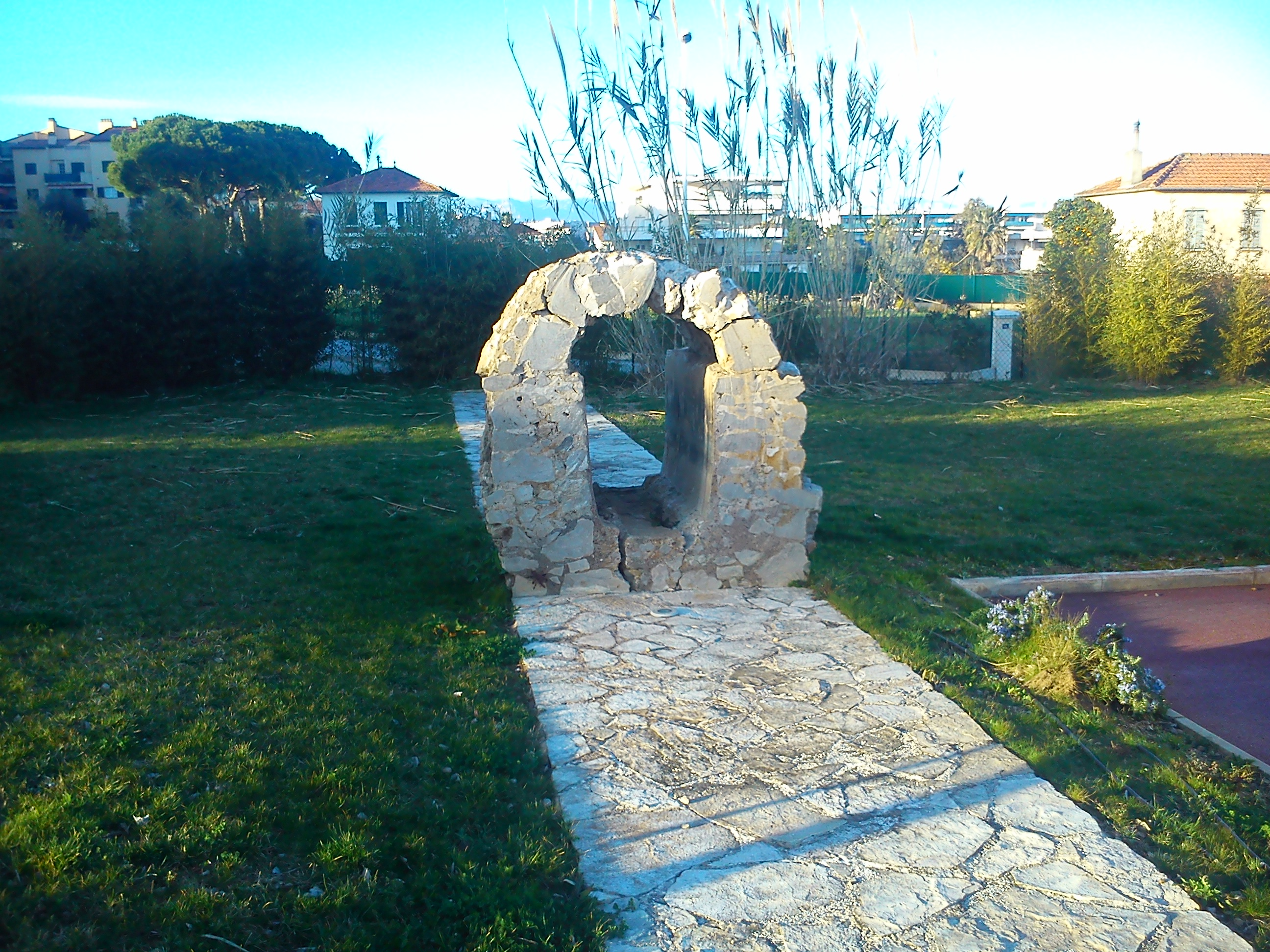
Fontveille Aqueduct; section of underground vault

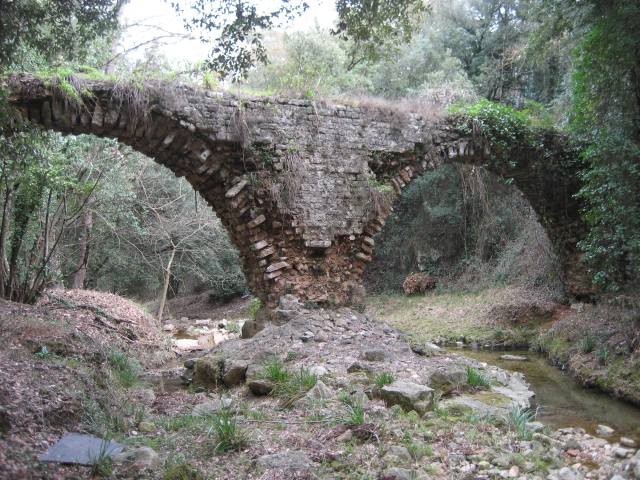
Bouillide aqueduct

=== Late antiquity ===
The Bishopric of Antibes was established c.450 by Pope Leo I, the first two bishops being Armentarius and Agroecius.

=== Middle Ages ===
The dust eventually settled to leave Antibes within the territory of the County of Provence, itself part of the Kingdom of Burgundy-Arles and from 1033 the Holy Roman Empire. In the tenth century the coastal areas of Provence were menaced by 'Saracen' raiders from Muslim Spain, who were finally driven out when Count William I of Provence captured their stronghold at Fraxinetum in 975. William rewarded the knights who had fought for him in this campaign by enfeoffing them with the liberated lands in southern Provence. One of these knights was a certain Rodoald, who became Lord of Antibes.

Rodoald's great-grandson Raimbaud appears to have relocated inland to Grasse around 1050, and his descendants sold the Lordship of Antibes to the bishopric during the episcopate of Bishop Bertrand (fl.1166-76).

During this period Antibes was still being raided periodically by Saracen pirates, and in 1124 they burned down Antibes Cathedral. The marauders continued to prey on the town over the following century, and in 1244 the Prince-Bishops of Antibes moved to Grasse to escape their depredations. They remained there for the next five centuries, despite an attempt to lure them back to Antibes by rebuilding the cathedral in 1250.

When the Western Schism began in 1378, splitting the Catholic world between two rival popes, the Bishop of Grasse backed Pope Urban VI even though Marie de Blois, mother of and regent to the infant Count Louis II of Provence, was a supporter of Urban's enemy Antipope Clement VII. In 1383 Marie therefore confiscated the Lordship of Antibes from the Bishops of Grasse and two years later awarded it to the brothers Marc and Luc Grimaldi, of the Genoese House of Grimaldi. The new Grimaldi lords built the Château Grimaldi as their residence in the town.

After the deaths of the Grimaldi brothers (Marc in 1398 and Luc in 1409), control of the Lordship of Antibes passed to five co-heirs. As a result of this fragmentation of power, the actions of individual local lords became increasingly irrelevant to the town's history, with the higher authority of the Count of Provence assuming greater significance instead.

=== Early Modern era ===
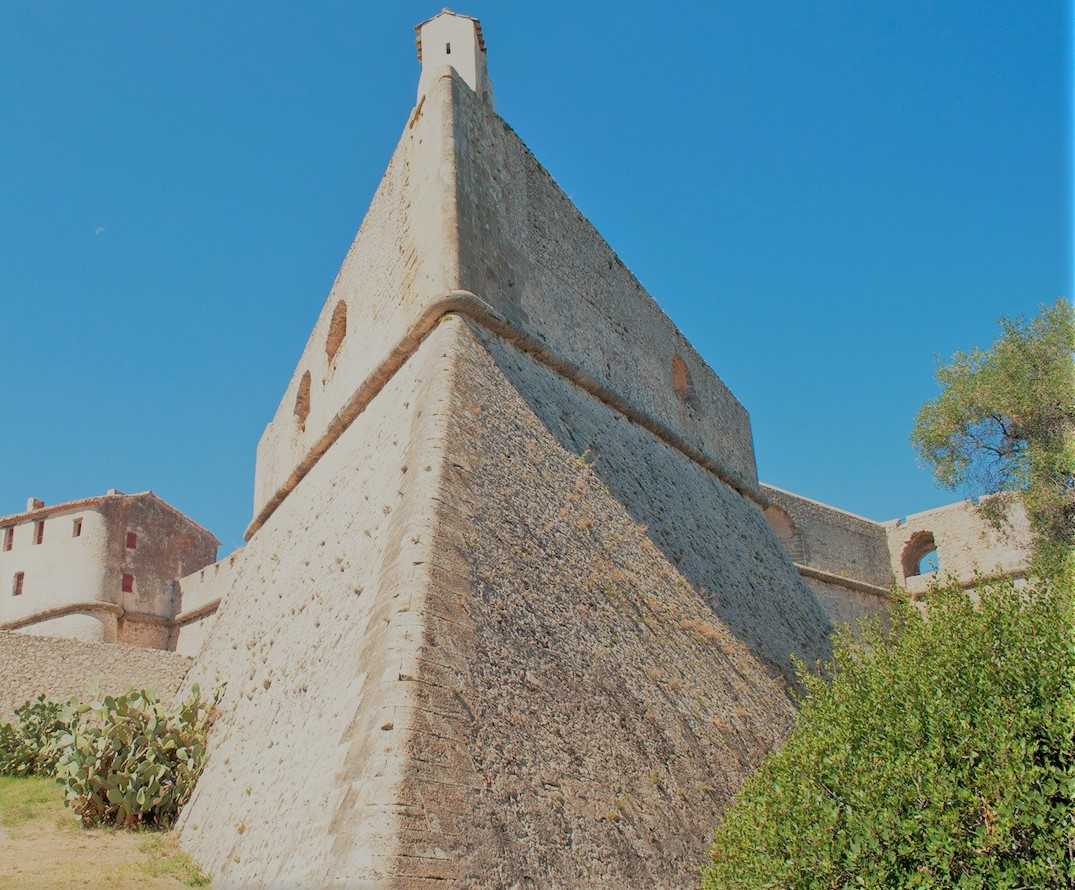
Fort Carré

With the death in 1481 of Count Charles III, Provence was inherited by King Louis XI and thereby annexed to France. As Antibes was in the far southeast of the County of Provence it therefore became the border town at France's southeastern extremity, guarding the frontier with the County of Nice, which was part of the Savoyard state. As such it was on the front line during the Italian Wars waged by France against Emperor Charles V, and was sacked in 1536 by Andrea Doria, a Genoese admiral in imperial service. Henry II of France therefore ordered the construction of Fort Carré in 1550 to guard the town against any future attacks, and the citadel was later reinforced by the renowned French military engineer Vauban.

In December 1746, during the War of the Austrian Succession, an Austro-Savoyard army under the command of Maximilian Ulysses Browne invaded France and besieged Antibes, subjecting the town to a heavy bombardment. The arrival of French reinforcements, and a revolt against the Austrian garrison at Genoa, obliged Browne to lift the siege on 1 February 1747, but by that point his guns had levelled 350 houses and also destroyed the cathedral again. The latter was subsequently rebuilt by Louis XV, and this version of the building is the one that has survived to the present day.

=== Modern era ===
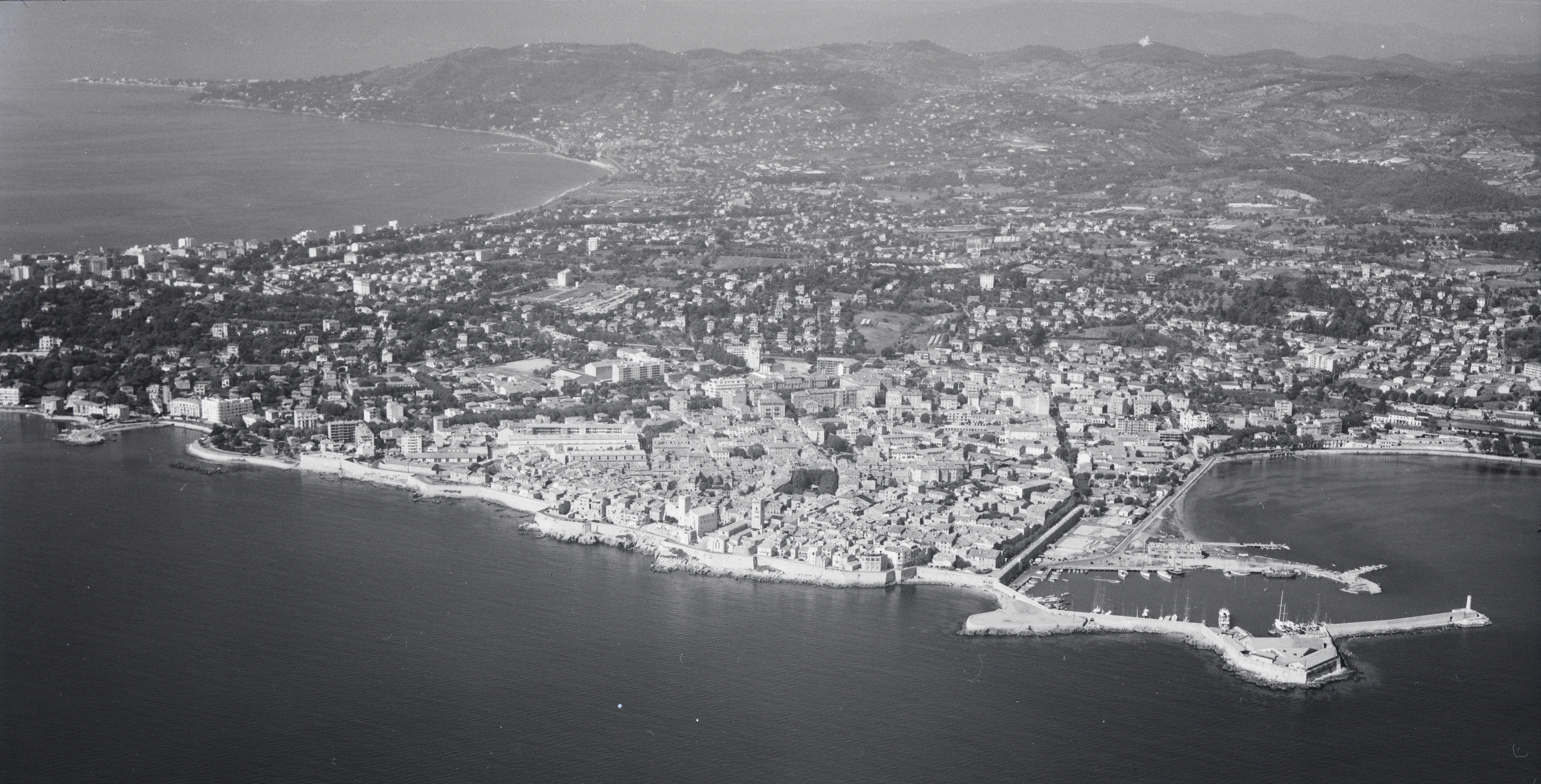
Aerial view of Antibes in 1957, before the expansion of Port Vauban

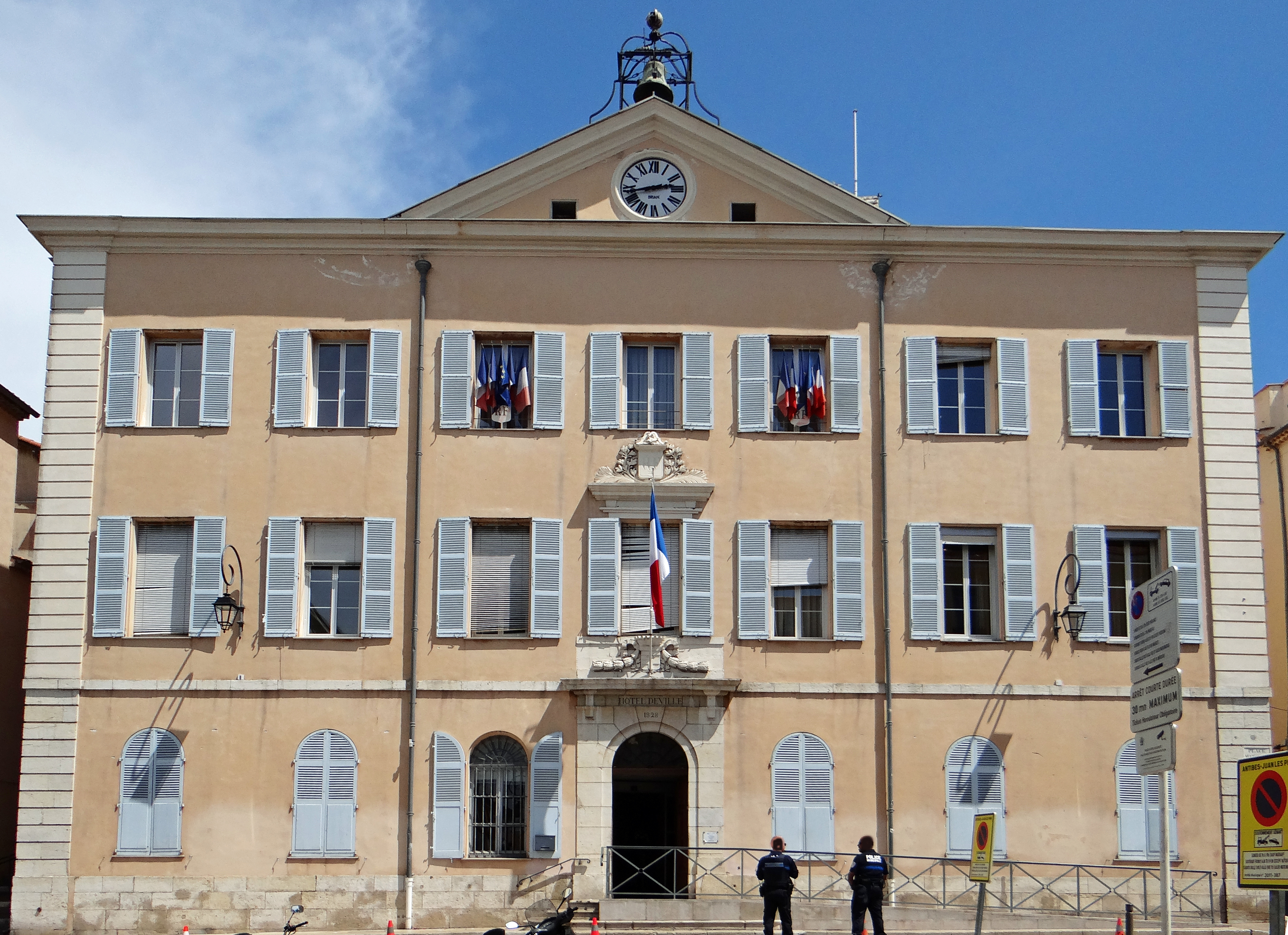
The Hôtel de Ville

On 1 March 1815, Napoléon Bonaparte landed on the beach at Golfe-Juan, 5 kilometres (3.1 mi) southwest of Antibes, having escaped exile on the island of Elba. He hoped for a warm welcome in Antibes, which had been supportive of his regime, but the townspeople closed their gates to him and he was therefore obliged to move on northward without stopping. He successfully reached Paris and seized power again, only to be conclusively defeated at the Battle of Waterloo. Today Golfe-Juan marks the beginning of the Route Napoléon, which traces the path taken by the emperor on his return from exile. The Hôtel de Ville was erected in Cours Masséna in 1828.

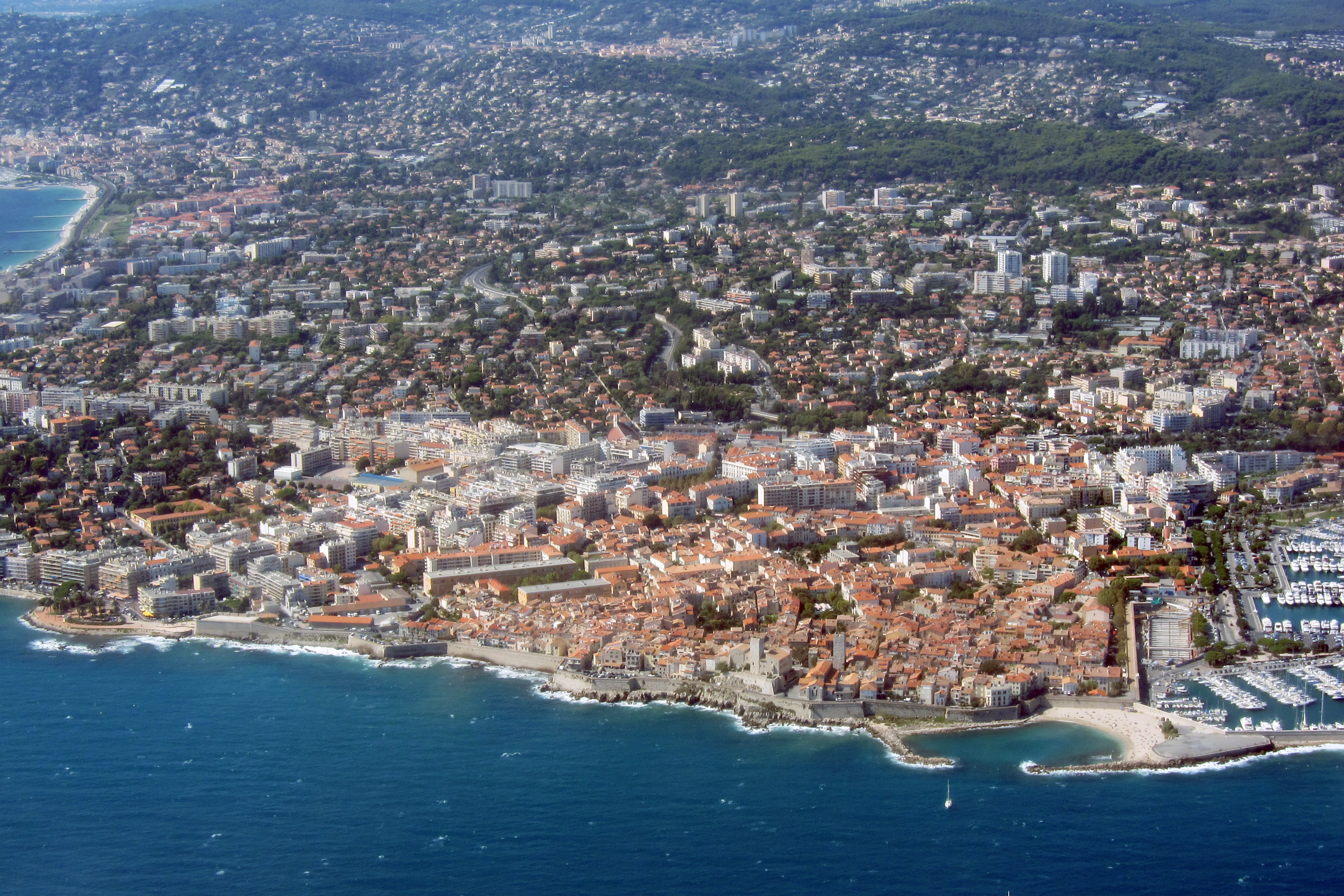
Aerial view of Antibes, 2012

Antibes was transferred from its former department of Var to the new one of Alpes-Maritimes in 1860. The harbor was again used for a "considerable" fishing industry and the area exported dried fruit, salt fish, and oil.

By the First World War, it had been connected by rail with Nice and most of its fortifications had been demolished to make way for new residential districts. In 1926, the old Château Grimaldi was bought by the local municipality and later restored for use as a museum. For six months in 1946, it was the home of the famous artist Pablo Picasso.

== Culture ==
=== Sports ===
Sport is an important part of the local culture; the town hosts the National Training Centre for basketball. The now demolished Jean Bunoz Sports Hall hosted several games of the 1999 FIBA EuroBasket. The city is home to Olympique Antibes, a professional basketball team of France's top division LNB Pro A, which plays its home games at the Azur Arena Antibes.

The local football team is FC Antibes, who play at the Stade du Fort Carré, best known for when it hosted one game of the 1938 World Cup, between Sweden and Cuba.

The town is also home to the Antibes 6 Day Race and the Antibes Yacht Show.

The town has various athletic associations and host a fair in September at Fort Carré that allows residents to meet the various athletic associations and explore their offerings.

=== Theatre and music ===
The Théâtre Antibea, Théâtre des Heures Bleues and Café Théâtre la Scène sur Mer all offer a variety of performances from orchestra music to dramatic plays. Music of all types, from live jazz to DJs spinning techno, can be found in the bars and nightclubs and there are a number of festivals and special outdoor concerts during the summer. Jazz is still the speciality around here.

M83 (an electronic band) hails from Antibes.

=== Festivals ===
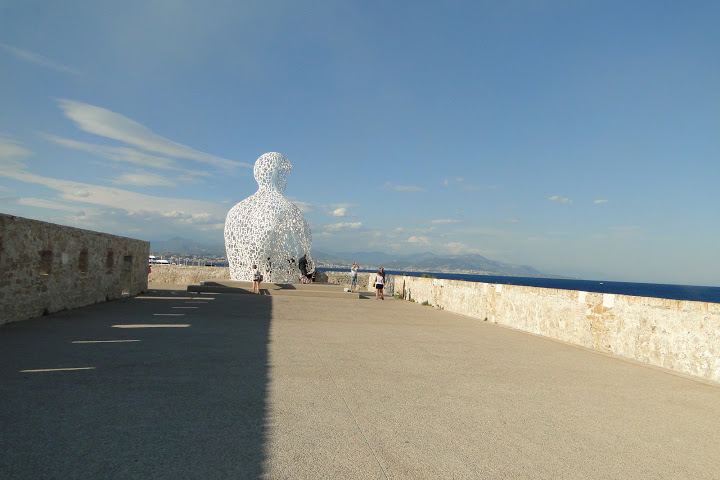
Le Nomade, by Jaume Plensa, Bastion St-Jaume, Antibes

Antibes and Juan les Pins host a number of festivals, mainly during the summer months. There is not much in the way of traditional cultural festivals in Antibes; most of the festivals focus on music and contemporary activities.

- Jazz à Juan Since its inception in 1960, the festival has attracted many jazz artists each year to play outdoors. (July).
- Antibes Yacht Show
- The Antique Show of Antibes attracts thousands of collectors for two weeks in April.
- Voiles d'Antibes is one of the world's biggest gatherings of old teak and brass sailing vessels. They converge on the port for one of the most regal regattas in the Mediterranean (June).
- The Saint Peter Celebrations is the annual celebration of the patron saint of fishermen. A colourful procession through the town is followed by all the local fishermen adorning their boats and floating along the coast (June).
- The Festival of Notre Dame de Bon Port begins on the first Thursday of July and continues to the following Sunday, celebrating Notre Dame de Bon Port, the local manifestation of the Virgin Mary. At sunrise on the Thursday a mass is held in the chapel next to the Garoupe lighthouse and fishermen dressed in traditional sailors' outfits subsequently carry the statue of Notre Dame de Bon Port from the chapel (where it resides for most of the year) down the Chemin de Calvaire to Antibes Cathedral at the head of a large procession. The statue remains in the cathedral for the remaining four days of the festival, which includes multiple masses, a torchlit procession through the town on the Saturday evening, and parties at which pissaladière is traditionally eaten.
- The Festival of Sacred Music takes place in Antibes Cathedral, which has renowned acoustics. Sacred music is the theme of this popular festival, which attracts huge crowds each year (January).

== Demographics ==
Historical population

Year	Pop.	±% p.a.
1793	4,135	—
1800	5,270	+3.53%
1806	4,792	−1.57%
1821	5,095	+0.41%
1831	5,565	+0.89%
1836	5,939	+1.31%
1841	5,615	−1.12%
1846	5,976	+1.25%
1851	6,163	+0.62%
1856	6,657	+1.55%
1861	6,829	+0.51%
1866	6,064	−2.35%
1872	6,843	+2.03%
1876	6,752	−0.33%
1881	5,923	−2.59%
1886	6,461	+1.75%
1891	7,401	+2.75%
1896	9,329	+4.74%
1901	10,947	+3.25%

Year	Pop.	±% p.a.
1906	11,753	+1.43%
1911	12,198	+0.75%
1921	12,768	+0.46%
1926	20,456	+9.89%
1931	26,071	+4.97%
1936	25,014	−0.82%
1946	23,574	−0.59%
1954	27,064	+1.74%
1962	35,439	+3.43%
1968	47,547	+5.02%
1975	55,960	+2.35%
1982	62,859	+1.67%
1990	70,005	+1.36%
1999	72,412	+0.38%
2007	75,770	+0.57%
2012	75,568	−0.05%
2017	72,999	−0.69%
2023	77,637	+1.03%

Source: EHESS and INSEE (1968–2023)

== Politics ==
=== Presidential elections second round ===
Election	Winning candidate	Party	%
2022	Emmanuel Macron	EM	54.40
2017	Emmanuel Macron	EM	59.38
2012	Nicolas Sarkozy	UMP	67.19
2007	Nicolas Sarkozy	UMP	70.89
2002	Jacques Chirac	RPR	72.68

== Sights ==
=== Beaches ===
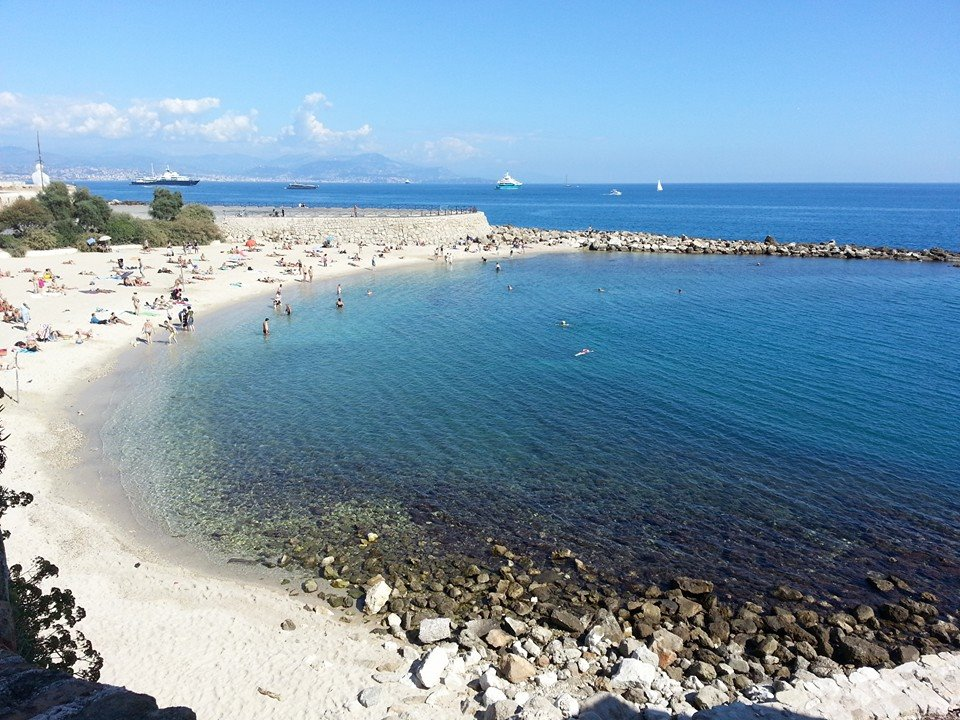
Plage de la Gravette, as seen from the city's walls

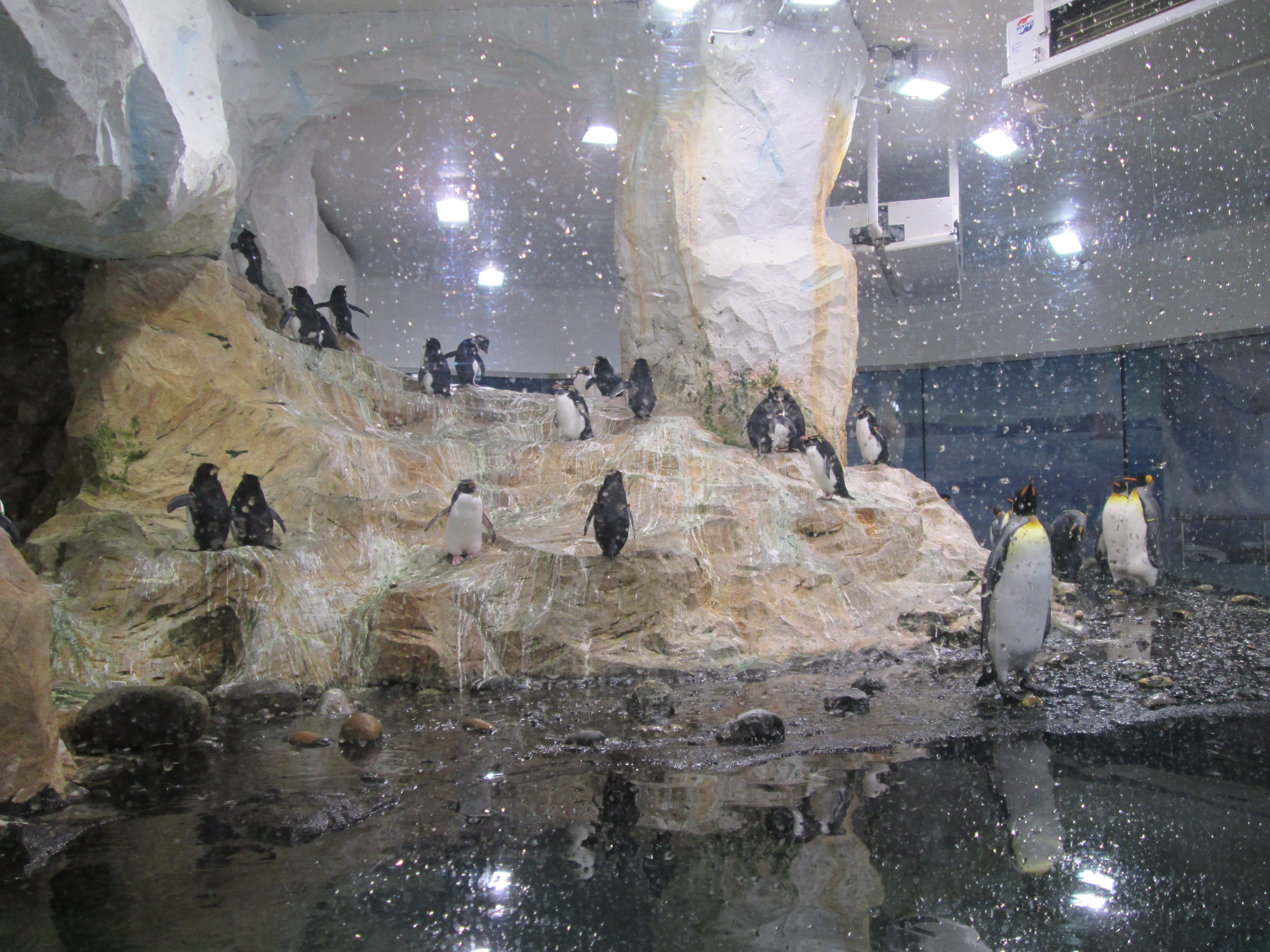
Penguins at Marineland

There are 48 beaches along the 25 km (16 miles) of coastline that surround Antibes and Juan les Pins.

=== Museums ===
Archaeology Museum
This museum sits atop the Promenade Amiral de Grasse in the old Bastion St Andre, a 17th-century fortress. The museum's collection focuses on the classical history of Antibes. Many artifacts, sculptures and amphorae found in local digs and shipwrecks from the harbour are displayed here.
Naval Museum of Napoleon
Housed in a 17th-century stone fort and tower, this museum presents a collection of Napoleonic memorabilia, paintings and naval models. Several wall paintings show historic moments in Napoleon's reign and there are also pieces of his clothing including one of the hats he wore.
Picasso Museum
The Picasso Museum houses one of the world's greatest Picasso collections: 24 paintings, 44 drawings, 32 lithographs, 11 oils on paper, 80 pieces of ceramics, two sculptures and five tapestries.
La Tour Museum
This small museum in the centre of town brings the contemporary history of Antibes to life through its exhibit of costumes, tools, photographs and other objects used by the local people.
Absinthe Museum
The Absinthe Museum is located in a basement in the Roman foundations of Old Antibes. It is dedicated to the manufacture and appreciation of this green liqueur.

=== Parks and gardens ===
The Exflora Park
The Exflora Park is a five-hectare (12 acres) garden open to the public. Next to the large olive grove, there are different styles of Mediterranean gardens, from ancient Rome to the exuberant Riviera of the 19th century. Fountains and ponds stretch along the terrace, making a waterway 500 metres (1,600 ft) long. Antibes is renowned for rose production, and rose bushes line the path leading to the sea. The exotic garden and palm grove is reminiscent of the Belle Époque, when English gardeners succeeded in planting flowers that bloom in winter, the season when the aristocracy visited the Côte d'Azur.
A little further on is the Théâtre de Verdure, inspired by Italian gardens, and a panoramic viewpoint with a view of the sea and the Iles des Lerins. In the style of Provençal gardens of the 18th century, there is a maze with sculpted hedges. Further on, Islamic gardens are featured, with an orange grove where the ground is patterned with terracotta irrigation pipes similar to those in the celebrated Seville Cathedral in Spain. The vegetable gardens and orchards in the Arsat are planted in hollows as in Morocco to protect them from the sun and maximise shadow and humidity. A representation of a Moroccan house pays homage to the painter Majorelle, creator of the blue garden in Marrakesh. In another area, the winter garden contains plants that flower in winter, such as mimosa and camellias.
The Eilenroc Gardens
Villa Eilenroc was built on a rock in the middle of a virtual desert. The area was transformed into a garden through the patience and talent of Jacques Greber, landscape architect and consultant to the Great Exhibition in New York City in 1939. He was commissioned by Mr Beaumont to create this park of 11 hectares (27 acres).
The gardens lie thirty metres above the sea with a view across the bay of the Cap. Planted with traditional Mediterranean species such as marine and parasol pines, Alep and Canary pines, cypress, oaks, olive trees, arbutus, lavender, thyme, rosemary, eucalyptus, ficus etc., as well as three kilometres (1.9 miles) of pittosporum hedges, a whole part of the park has been created with plants found in the Antibes area in 1920.
Thuret Park
In 1857, Gustave Thuret discovered the Cap d'Antibes and bought five hectares (12 acres) of land where he built a villa and began the creation of a park. Bequeathed to the state by his heirs, the Jardin botanique de la Villa Thuret is now managed by the INRA (National Institute of Agronomic Research). The collection of trees and exotic plants, and the rich earth, provide many opportunities for learning, and the cross-fertilisation of plant species that grow on the Mediterranean coast.
Marineland
In 1970, Roland de la Poype created this animal exhibition park called Marineland in Antibes. First, it was a small oceanarium with a few pools and animals, but now it is one of the biggest in the world and receives more than 1,200,000 visitors per year. It is the only French sea park featuring two cetacean species: killer whales and dolphins.

=== Garoupe Lighthouse ===
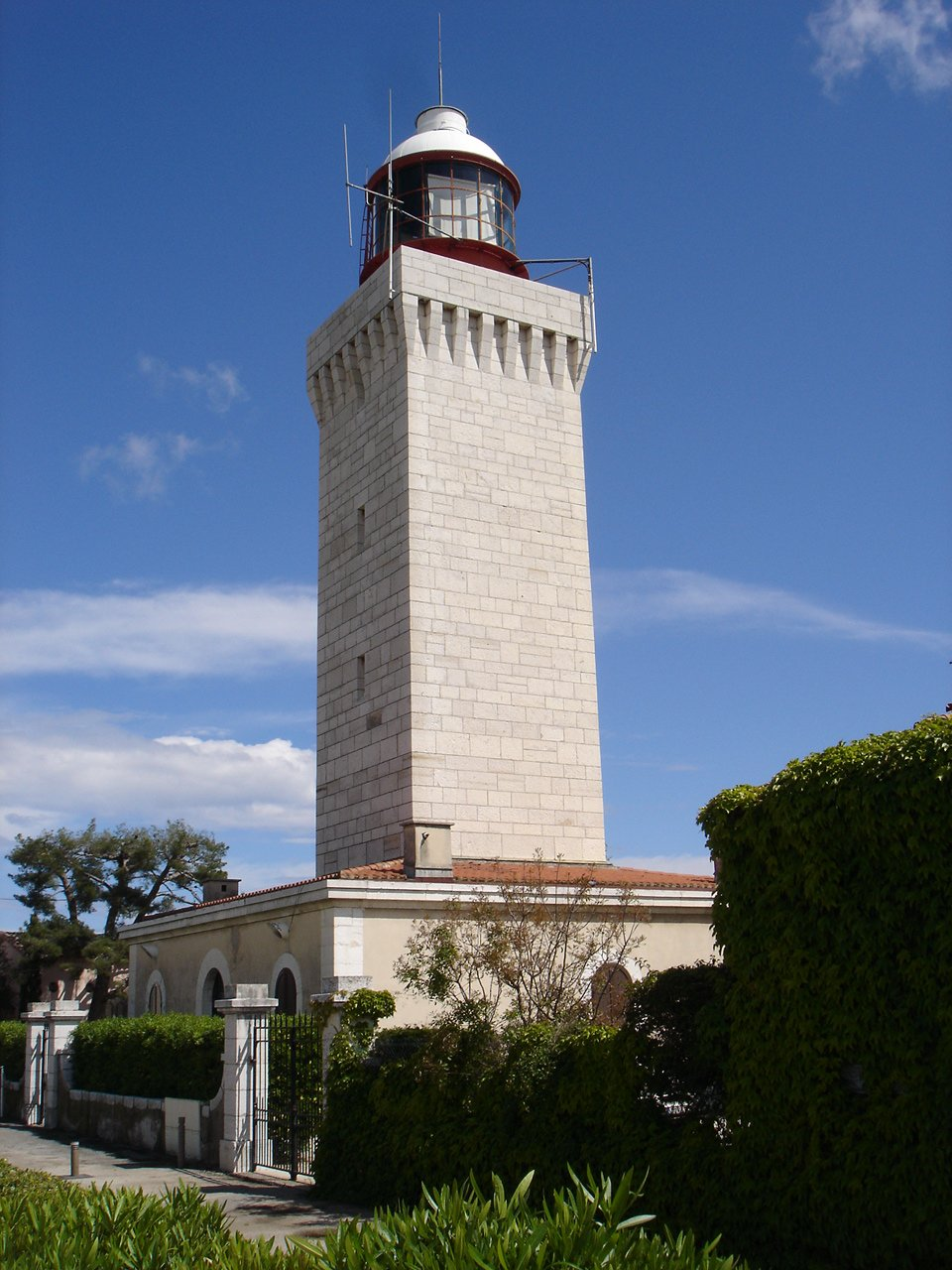
Garoupe Lighthouse

The old lighthouse of Antibes provides views from its lofty hilltop. To get to this location, it is approximately one kilometre north of the Chemin de Calvaire from the Plage de la Salis.

=== Church of the Immaculate Conception (Antibes Cathedral) ===
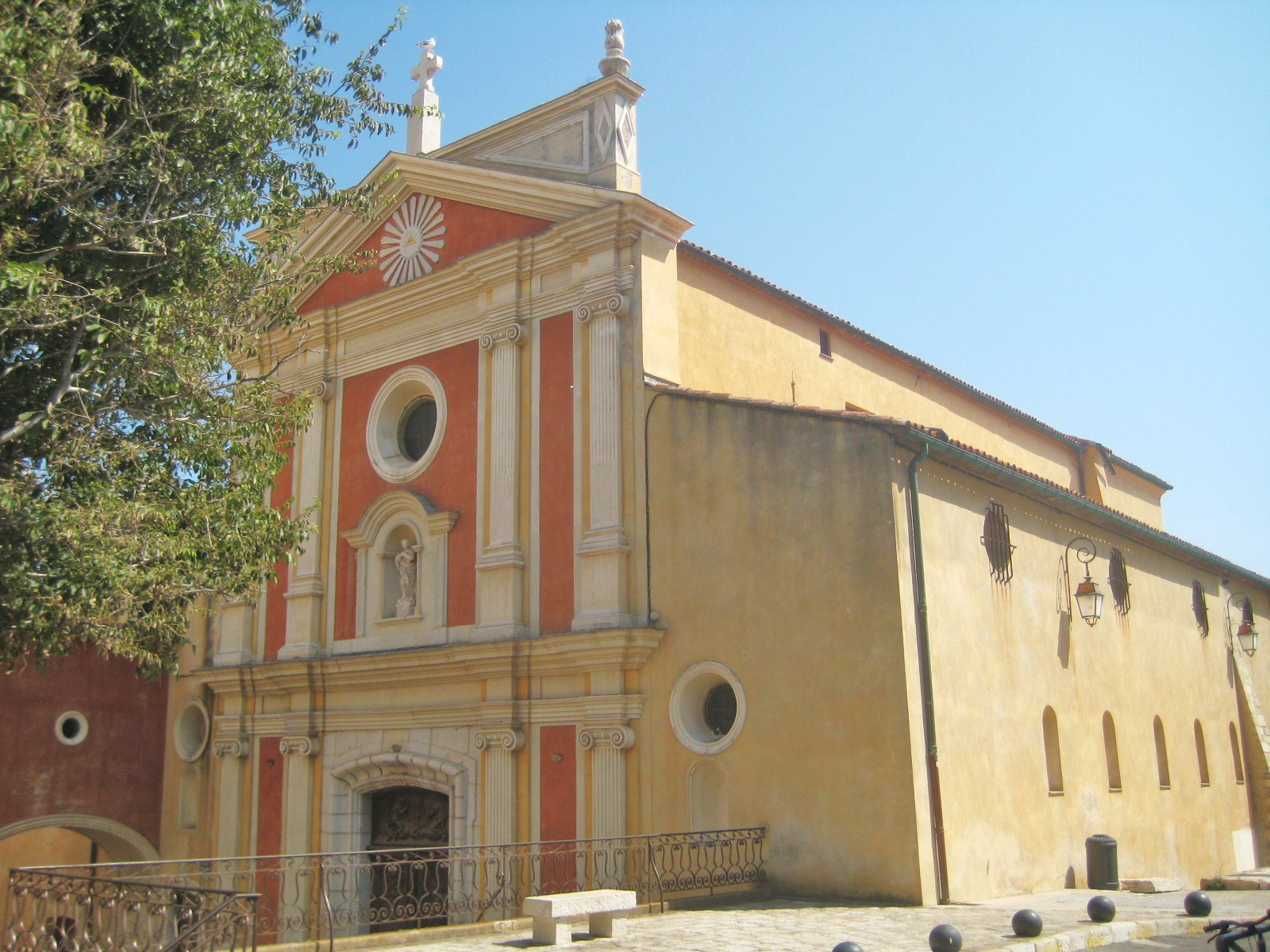
Church of the Immaculate Conception

The Antibes Cathedral was first built by Bishop Armentarius in the fifth century. It was destroyed multiple times during its history, notably by Saracen pirates in 1124 and by Austrian bombardment during the 1746-7 Siege of Antibes. Its current façade dates to the rebuilding that followed the latter catastrophe, and blends Latin classical symmetry and religious fantasy. The interior houses some impressive pieces such as a Baroque altarpiece and life-sized wooden carving of Christ's death from 1447.

=== Hôtel du Cap-Eden-Roc ===
This large villa, set in "a forest" at the tip of the Cap d'Antibes peninsula, re-creates a 19th-century château. Since 1870 (then called Villa Soleil) the white-walled Hôtel du Cap on the French Riviera has been a resort. Guests have included Marlene Dietrich, the Duke and Duchess of Windsor and Winston Churchill. Elizabeth Taylor and Richard Burton conducted an affair and honeymooned there.

=== Ports ===
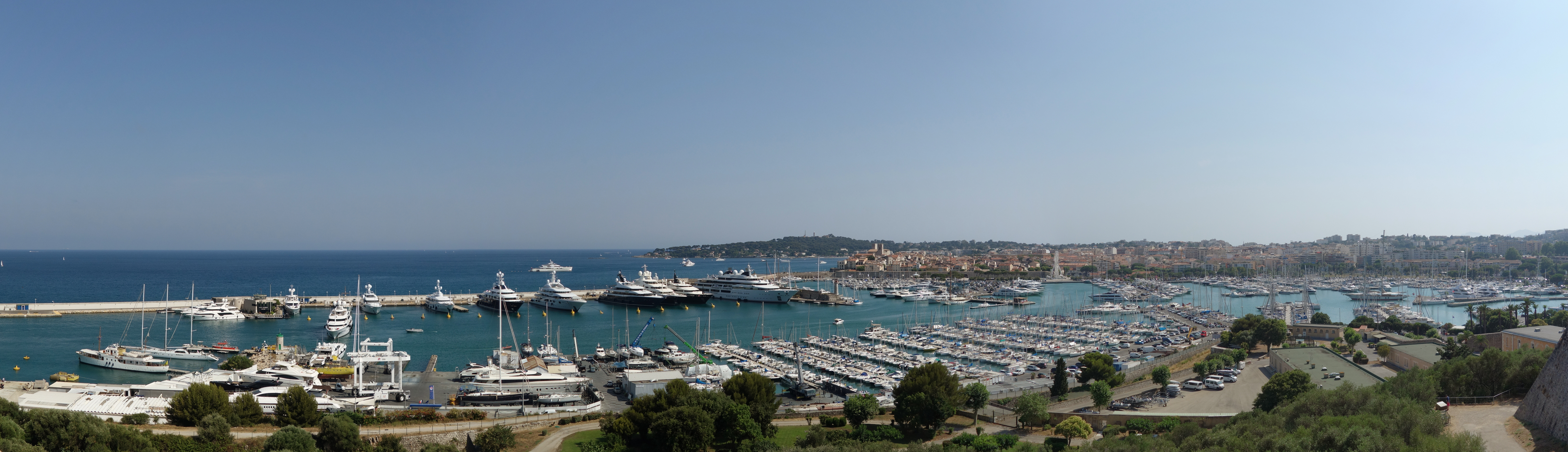
Port Vauban, the main port of Antibes

There are many yachting harbours which provide moorings for a range of ships ranging from fishing vessels to full sized yachts.

- Port Vauban: The largest yachting harbour in Europe, with more than 2,000 moorings, can accommodate craft of more than 100 metres. This old port was the heart of the ancient Greek city of Antipolis and has a long and colourful history which includes Ligurians, Romans and Crusaders on their way to the Holy Land. Today, it is the largest marina in Europe, serving both local fishing boats and luxury yachts.
- Port Galice: 542 moorings
- Port de la Salis: 233 moorings
- Port du Croûton: 390 moorings
- Port de l'Olivette: Situated in the sheltered cove of the same name, this is a harbour for sailors and their wooden fishing boats who enjoy the old marine, provencal traditions.

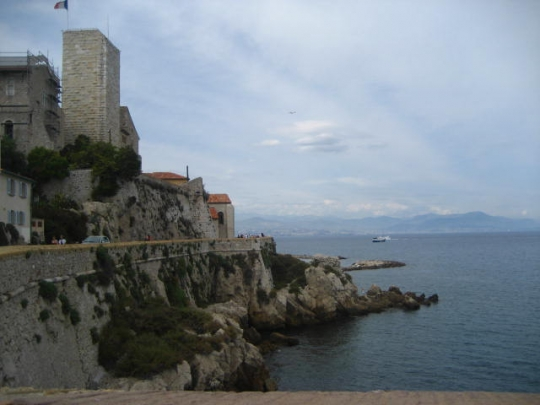
City walls of Antibes by the sea shore

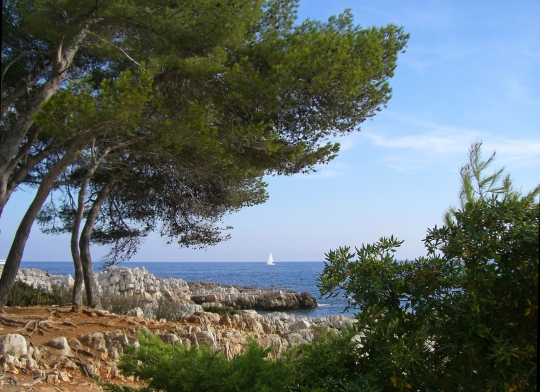
The view of the Gulf of Antibes

== Climate ==
Antibes experiences a Mediterranean climate. On average, it experiences 7.9 days per year with a minimum temperature below 0 °C (32.0 °F), no days per year with a minimum temperature below −10 °C (14.0 °F), no days per year with a maximum temperature below 0 °C (32.0 °F), and 28.2 days per year with a maximum temperature above 30 °C (86.0 °F). The record high temperature was 38.5 °C (101.3 °F) on 17 July 2003 and 1 August 2006, while the record low temperature was −4.4 °C (24.1 °F) on 1 March 2005.

Climate data for Antibes (1991–2020 averages, extremes 1988–present)
Month	Jan	Feb	Mar	Apr	May	Jun	Jul	Aug	Sep	Oct	Nov	Dec	Year
Record high °C (°F)	22.8 (73.0)	26.3 (79.3)	26.0 (78.8)	28.0 (82.4)	31.8 (89.2)	35.8 (96.4)	38.5 (101.3)	38.5 (101.3)	33.9 (93.0)	31.0 (87.8)	27.0 (80.6)	23.2 (73.8)	38.5 (101.3)
Mean daily maximum °C (°F)	13.5 (56.3)	13.9 (57.0)	16.2 (61.2)	18.5 (65.3)	22.3 (72.1)	26.3 (79.3)	29.1 (84.4)	29.6 (85.3)	25.9 (78.6)	21.6 (70.9)	17.2 (63.0)	14.3 (57.7)	20.7 (69.3)
Daily mean °C (°F)	8.8 (47.8)	9.1 (48.4)	11.4 (52.5)	13.8 (56.8)	17.6 (63.7)	21.5 (70.7)	24.4 (75.9)	24.3 (75.7)	20.8 (69.4)	17.0 (62.6)	12.7 (54.9)	9.7 (49.5)	15.9 (60.7)
Mean daily minimum °C (°F)	4.2 (39.6)	4.3 (39.7)	6.5 (43.7)	9.0 (48.2)	12.8 (55.0)	16.7 (62.1)	19.1 (66.4)	19.1 (66.4)	15.7 (60.3)	12.4 (54.3)	8.2 (46.8)	5.0 (41.0)	11.1 (52.0)
Record low °C (°F)	−4.0 (24.8)	−3.4 (25.9)	−4.4 (24.1)	0.3 (32.5)	4.1 (39.4)	8.8 (47.8)	11.9 (53.4)	11.7 (53.1)	7.0 (44.6)	0.5 (32.9)	−2.8 (27.0)	−3.3 (26.1)	−4.4 (24.1)
Average precipitation mm (inches)	88.3 (3.48)	59.7 (2.35)	58.0 (2.28)	74.0 (2.91)	47.0 (1.85)	30.2 (1.19)	17.1 (0.67)	24.3 (0.96)	89.8 (3.54)	132.5 (5.22)	155.6 (6.13)	103.0 (4.06)	879.5 (34.64)
Average precipitation days (≥ 1.0 mm)	6.3	5.1	5.2	6.8	4.9	3.6	1.8	2.5	4.8	7.4	8.6	6.2	63.2
Source: Meteociel

== Shopping ==
- Marché Provençal

== Transport ==
The Antibes station is the railway station serving the town, offering connections to Nice, Cannes, Marseille, Grasse, Saint-Raphaël, Var, Les Arcs, Milan, Ventimiglia, Paris and several other destinations. This railway station is in the centre of town. There is another railway station, Juan-les-Pins. The nearest airports are Nice Côte d'Azur Airport and Cannes Airport.

== Notable people ==
=== Born in Antibes ===
- Jacques Audiberti (1899–1965), playwright, poet and novelist, Theatre of the Absurd
- Jacques Barnaud (1893–1962), banker and businessman
- Léon Barnaud (1845–1909), naval officer
- Claire Bertrand (born 1982), motorcycle trials rider
- Julie Blaise (born 1975), swimmer
- Alexandra Borchio-Fontimp (born 1981), journalist and politician
- Nicolas Boukhrief (born 1963), screenwriter, film director
- Christian Damiano (born 1950), football player and manager
- Joseph-David de Barquier (1757–1844), commander from the French Revolution
- Ignazio Dracopoli (1887–1923), Anglo–French cartographer and explorer
- Laurent Gagnier (born 1979), footballer
- Christophe Gans (born 1961), film director, producer and screenwriter
- Jean-Pierre Gattuso (born 1958), ocean scientist
- Yann Gonzalez (born 1977), filmmaker
- Laurent Gras (born 1965), chef
- Franck Iacono (born 1966), swimmer
- Christophe Kalfayan, (born 1969), swimmer
- Laurent Landi (born 1977), gymnastics coach and former gymnast
- Kamel Larbi (born 1985), footballer
- Marcel Lucien (1902–1958), cinematographer
- André Masséna (1758–1817), Napoleonic general and Marshal of the Empire
- François Victor Massena, 3rd Duke of Rivoli (1799–1863), amateur ornithologist, son of André
- Marie-Louise Meilland (1920–1987), rose breeder
- Judith Miller (1941–2017), psychoanalyst and philosopher
- David Milinković (born 1994), footballer
- Antoine Joseph Monneron (1736–1815), merchant and businessman
- Charles Claude Ange Monneron (1735–1799), businessman, banker and politician
- Guillaume Musso (born 1974), novelist
- Coline-Marie Orliac (born 1989), harpist
- Éric Pauget (born 1970), politician
- Henri Proglio (born 1949), businessman
- Honoré Charles Reille (1775–1860), Marshal of France
- Eric Ripert (born 1965), chef, author and television personality
- Prince Dimitri Romanov (1926–2016), descendant of Russia's former ruling dynasty, a banker, philanthropist and author
- Pierre Sansot (1928–2005), anthropologist and sociologist
- Paul Signac (1863–1935), painter
- Halima Soussi (born 1965), basketball player
- Sabine Sun (1933–2014), actress
- Honoré Tournély (1658–1729), Catholic theologian, a Gallican opponent of Jansenism
- Luc-Arthur Vebobe (born 1980), basketball player
- Honoré Vial (1766–1813), military leader and diplomat in the French Revolutionary Wars
- John Wilkins (born 1989), basketballer

=== Lived or living in Antibes ===
- Harold Ambellan (1912–2006), American sculptor
- Mehdi Bahmad, Moroccan-Canadian singer-songwriter
- Madeleine Bayon (born 1997), gymnast
- Cassandre Beaugrand (born 1997), triathlete
- Anna-Eva Bergman (1909–1987), Norwegian artist
- Gustave Boissonade (1825–1910), legal scholar
- Alizée Costes (born 1994), gymnast
- Mike Cumberlege (1905–1945), Royal Navy officer
- Camille Curti (born 1999), gymnast
- George Davison (1854–1930), English photographer
- Édouard Delaporte (1909–1983), painter, architect and sculptor
- Noé Delpech (born 1986), sailor
- Frances Scott Fitzgerald (1921–1986), American writer and journalist, daughter of Zelda and Scott
- Zelda Fitzgerald (1900–1948), American novelist, painter and socialite
- Paul Gallico (1897–1976), American novelist
- Graham Greene (1904–1991), English writer and journalist; lived in Antibes in his later years
- Gloria Guinness (1912–1980), Mexican socialite and fashion and cultural icon
- Lilian Harvey (1906–1968), British-German actress and singer
- Nikos Kazantzakis (1883–1957), writer of Zorba the Greek; owned a villa in Old Town
- Élie Lévy (1895–1945), medical doctor
- Chris Lilley (born 1959), British computer scientist
- Ruth Madoff (born 1941), wife of Bernie Madoff
- Alexis Martin (born 1994), gymnast
- Claire Martin (born 1998), gymnast
- Daniil Medvedev (born 1996), tennis player
- Gerald and Sara Murphy (1888–1964 & 1883–1975), wealthy expatriate Americans credited with establishing the French Riviera as a summer resort
- Noémie Nadaud (born 1995), gymnast
- Francisco Negrín (born 1963), creative director
- Aristotle Onassis (1906–1975), Greek shipping magnate
- Brynhild Parker (1907–1987), British artist
- Stephen Roche (born 1959), Irish cyclist
- Gérard Souzay (1918–2004), baritone
- Alfred Wotquenne (1867–1935), Belgian musical bibliographer
- Nemo Zhou (born 2000), Canadian chess player

== Twin towns – sister cities ==
Antibes is twinned with:

- Aalborg, Denmark
- Desenzano del Garda, Italy
- Eilat, Israel
- (Republic of Ireland) Kinsale, Ireland
- Krasnogorsk, Russia
- Newport Beach, United States
- Olympia, Greece
- Schwäbisch Gmünd, Germany

== See also ==
- Communes of the Alpes-Maritimes department
- Tour Grimaldi
- Notre Dame de la Garoupe
