= Pierre Sansot =

French anthropologist and writer

Pierre Sansot (9 June 1928, Antibes – 6 May 2005, Grenoble) was a French anthropologist and writer.
