= Stade du Fort Carré =

French football stadium

Fort Carré Stadium
- Stade du Fort Carré
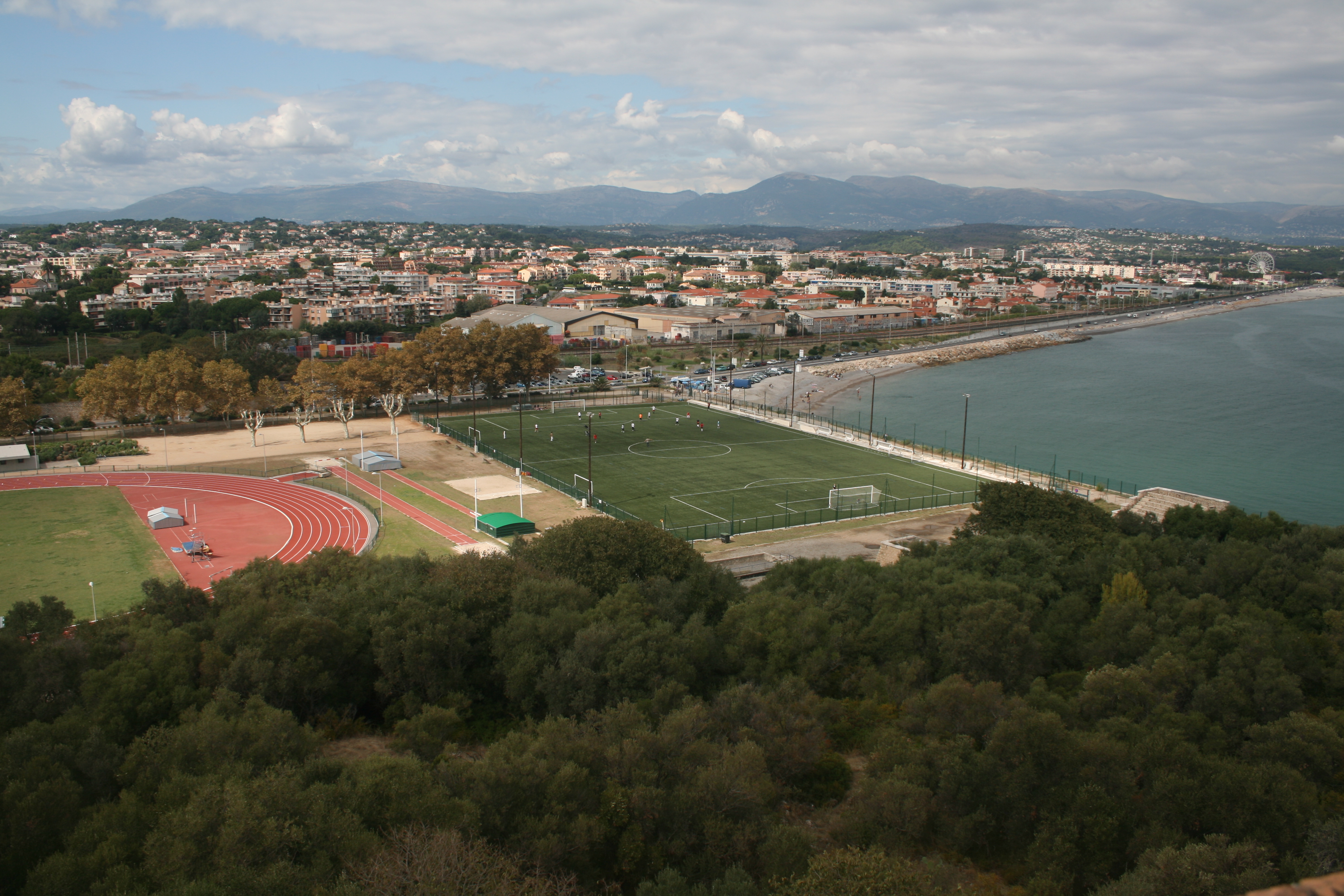
- Stade du Fort Carré in 2009
- Interactive map of Fort Carré Stadium
- Address: 11, avenue du 11 Novembre, 06600 Antibes; Antibes; France
- Coordinates: 43°35′27″N 7°7′32″E
- Capacity: 7000
- Type: Association football and athletics stadium
- Surface: Synthetic grass

Construction
- Opened: 1935
- Renovated: 1945

Tenants
- FC Antibes; ER Athletisme Antibes

Stade du Fort Carré is a multi-use stadium in Antibes, France, home ground of the FC Antibes, named after the neighboring Fort Carré. It is currently used mostly for football matches and the local athletics club.

== History ==
The stadium seats 7,000 people.

During the 1938 World Cup, it hosted one game, between Sweden and Cuba.
