= Musée Picasso (Antibes) =

Museum in Antibes, France

Coordinates: 43°34′51″N 7°7′42″E

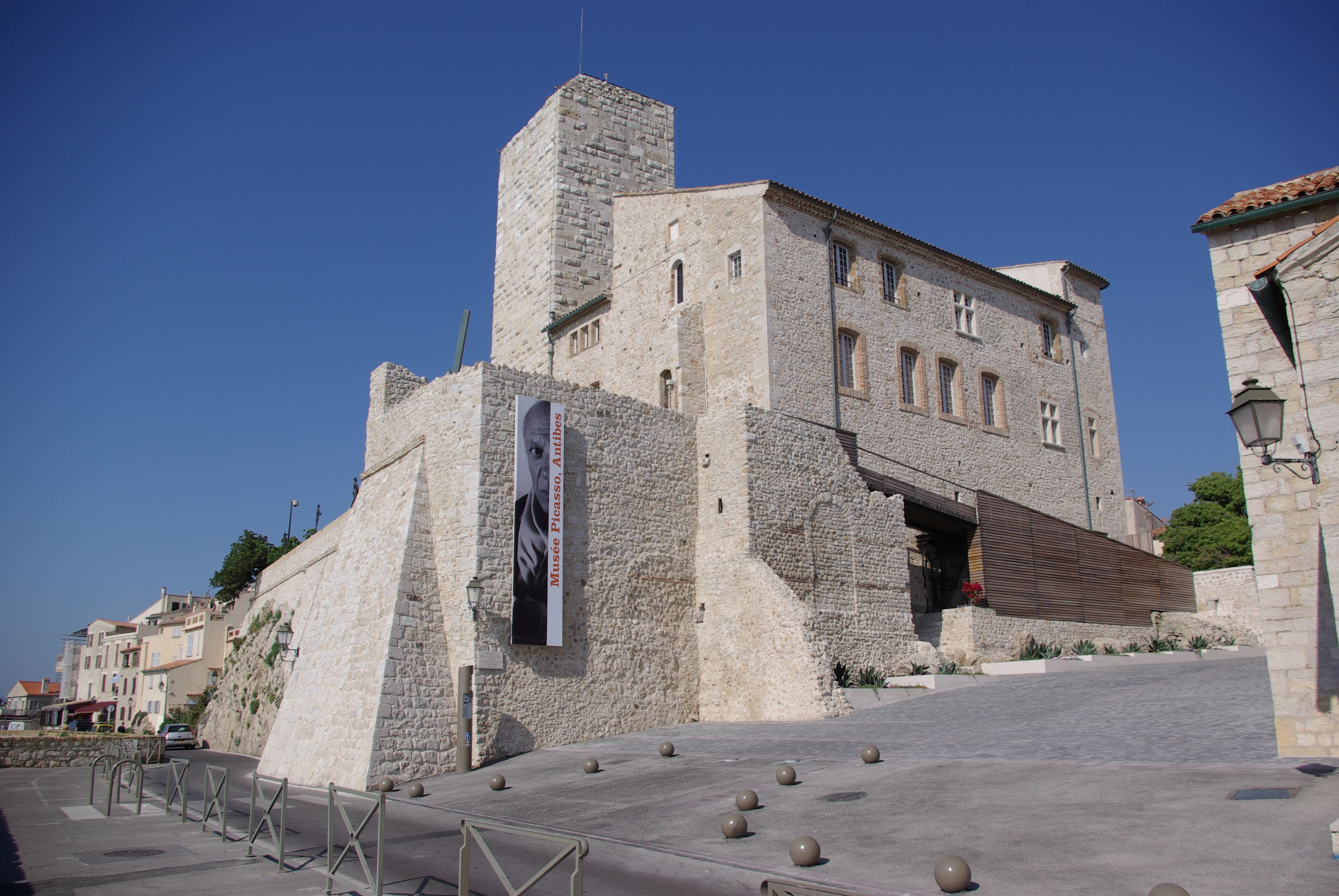
Musée Picasso, in Antibes

The Musée Picasso (French: [myze pikaso]), formerly the Château Grimaldi at Antibes, is built upon the foundations of the ancient Greek town of Antipolis. Antibes is a resort town in the Alpes-Maritimes department in Southeastern France, on the Mediterranean Sea. The castle has been classified as a historical monument since 29 April 1928.

== History ==
The Château Grimaldi is built upon the foundations of the ancient Greek town of Antipolis. The château was originally built in the late fourteenth century as the residence of the town's feudal lords Marc and Luc Grimaldi, scions of the famous Grimaldi Dynasty. In the early 17th century, the Grimaldis moved to Monaco and the château was acquired by Henry IV in 1608. It then served as the residence of the local governor for nearly two centuries.

During the French Revolution it was seized by the revolutionary authorities and was converted for use as a town hall; it remained in municipal use until the council relocated to a purpose-built Hôtel de Ville in Cours Masséna in 1828. After the Bourbon Restoration, the château was converted into a barracks.

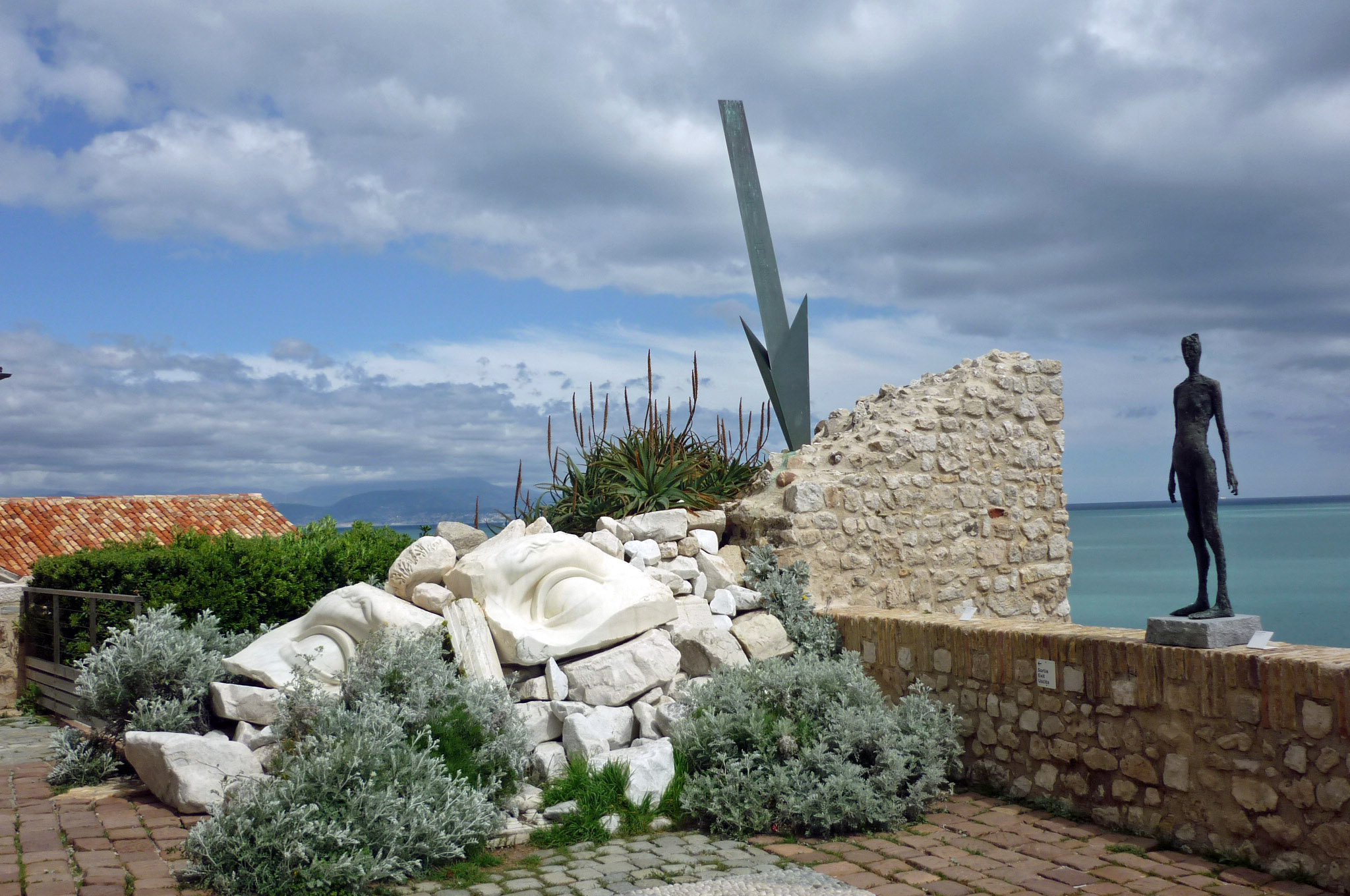
The terrace of the museum

In 1925, the château was acquired by the City of Antibes and became known as the Grimaldi Museum, and for six months in 1946, it was the home of the famous artist Pablo Picasso.

Picasso himself donated works to the museum, altogether 23 paintings and 44 drawings, most notably his paintings La Chèvre (sculpture) and La Joie de vivre.

The museum was renamed the Musée Picasso in December 1966. Following her death in 1986, Picasso's second wife Jacqueline bequeathed many works by Picasso to the museum. Two new galleries were established on the ground floor, funded by a donation from the Hans Hartung and Anna-Eva Bergman Foundation, in 2001.

== See also ==
- List of single-artist museums
