= Mehdi Bahmad =

Moroccan-Canadian singer, songwriter

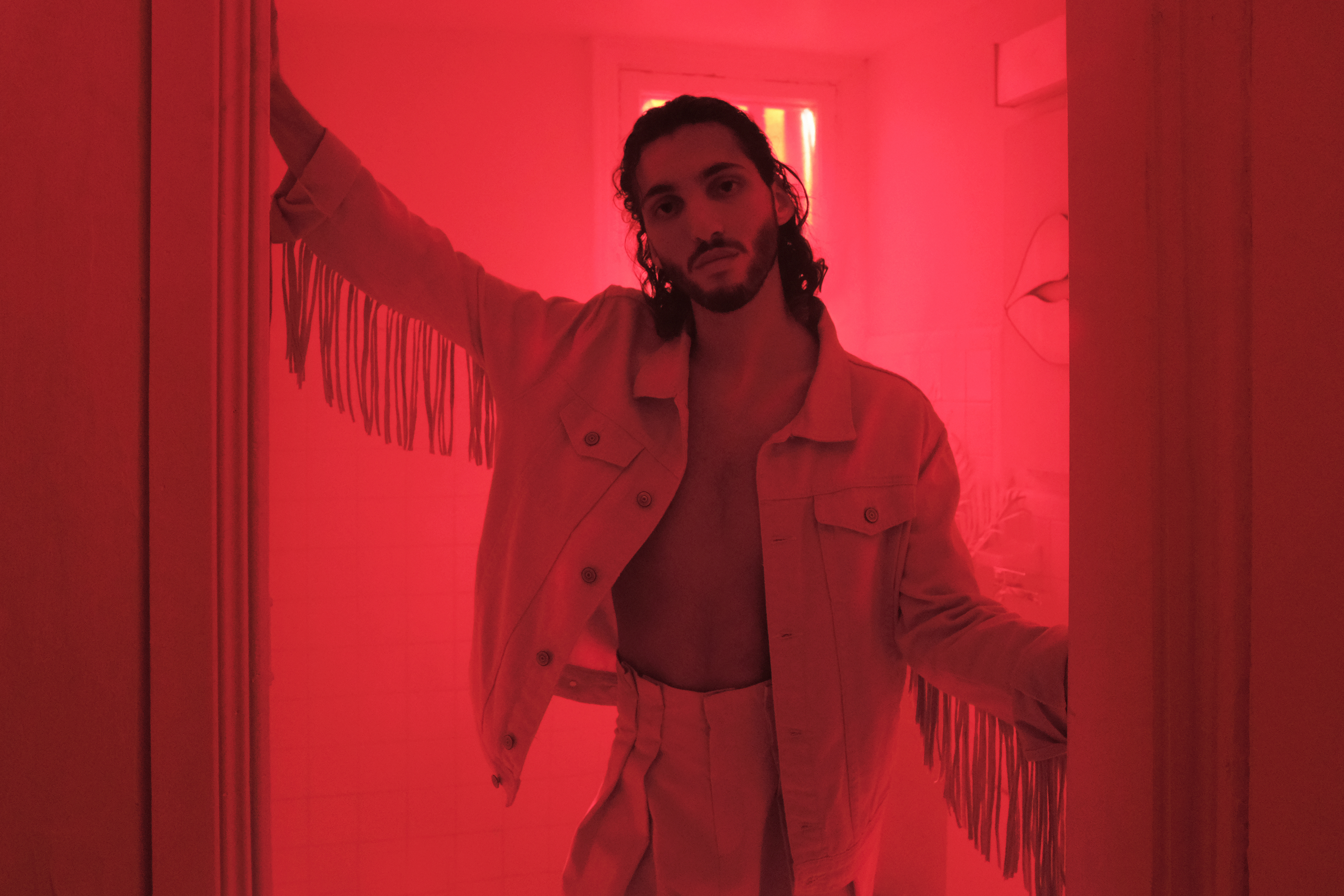
- Mehdi Bahmad - Rouge a Levres - Music Video Outtake - 11

Background information
- Born: Rabat, Morocco
- Genres: Pop
- Occupations: Singer; Songwriter
- Years active: 2018-present
- Website: mehdibahmad.com

Mehdi Bahmad (Arabic: مهدي بحمد) is a Moroccan-Canadian singer-songwriter.

== Early life ==
Born in Rabat to an Amazigh father and Moroccan mother, Bahmad lived with his family in Agadir, Morocco, and Antibes, France, before moving to Montréal, Canada, when he was eight years old. In addition to French, he speaks English and Derija.

== Music career ==
Coming from a visual arts background, Mehdi Bahmad oversees all creative aspect of his work, creating his artworks as well as directing and choreographing his music videos. He cites the duality of his Eastern and Western identities as a source of inspiration.

On April 17, 2018, Bahmad independently released the first self-produced and home-recorded single "Rouge à lèvres" for which the self-directed music video was premiered by iHeart Radio.

On June 28, 2019, he released the single "H.E.N.N.A.", addressing the challenges of growing up as a millennial in a Muslim family, and the broader generational gap in North-African and Middle-Eastern societies. The self-directed music video he released on August 11 was later selected as part of the Official Selection at the 10th anniversary edition of Aesthetica Short Film Festival and laureate at various short film festivals. On August 23, he released the single "Lay" followed by another self-directed visual, premiered by Flaunt.

On October 25, 2019, Mehdi Bahmad independently released his debut EP "Khôl", reaching number 52 on iTunes Canada Top 200 Alternative Albums. Speaking about his inspiration, Bahmad shares: "This EP represents the creation of my artistic persona. this alter-ego that ruled the secret garden I had to nurture growing up as a self-defense mechanism". Of the title "Khôl", Bahmad states, "I transpose this mineral powder into a symbol of union and equality. Originally, it was worn by all, and from all social classes. The same eyes, smudged with black, glazing at the same burning sun".

On March 12, 2020, he released the self-directed music video for his song ''Buy Me (a Bird)''. The music video was premiered by Vogue Arabia.

On March 25, 2020, Olof Dreijer, from the Swedish electronic duo The Knife, released a remix of "Rouge à lèvres" which was originally inspired by The Knife's 2003 single "Pass This On". In the lyrics we can read: "Cheap string lights on, put The Knife on, rolled back eyes mon rouge à lèvres stains".

Since then, Mehdi Bahmad released the singles "Sukkar", "Rien" and "Rien (Walo)", the latter reaching respectively number 3 and 40 on Anghami Top International Downloads and Top French Songs.

In 2022, Bahmad was spokesperson for Amnesty International Canada's latest campaign "Écrire, ça libère".

== Discography ==
=== EPs ===
Title	Year	Track list
Khôl	2019	1. Lay (Intro); 2. Lay; 3. H.E.N.N.A.; 4. Buy Me (a Bird); 5. Khôl
Khôl (Remixes)	2020	1. Lay (P.A.F.F. Remix); 2. H.E.N.N.A. (King Arthur Remix); 4. Buy Me (a Bird) (LUXXURY Remix); 5. Khôl (GOLDHOUSE Remix)
