= Fort Carré =

Medieval fort in southern France

- Antibes, France
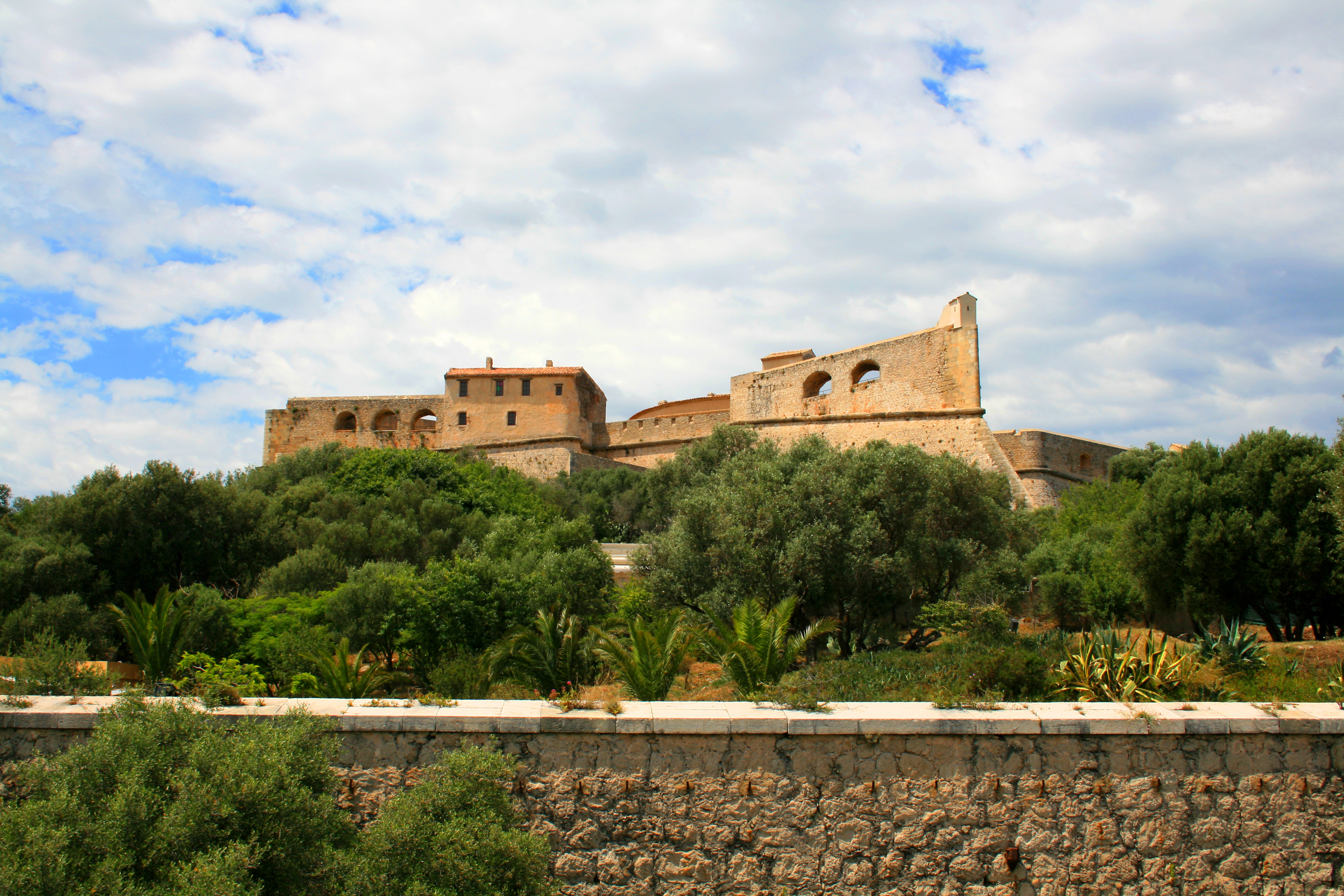
- Fort Carré viewed from the south

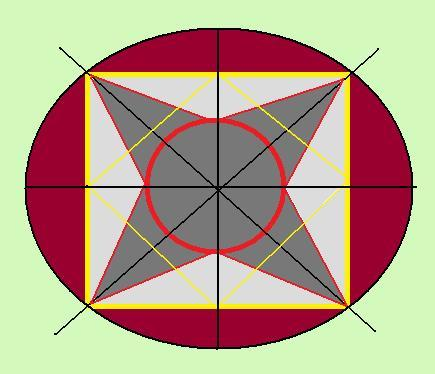
- Jean de Renaud's architectural design (the fortress was already built when Vauban made his contribution; he just added the wall around the fortress)

Site information
- Type: Fort
- Owner: Museum
- Controlled by: France
- Open to the public: Yes

Location
- Coordinates: 43.590136943059434°N 7.126951565284516°E

Site history
- Built: 1553

See Stade du Fort Carré for the sports stadium.

Fort Carré, often called the Fort Carré d'Antibes, is a 16th-century star-shaped fort of four arrow-head shaped bastions that stands on a 26-meter high promontory in Antibes, France. Henry II ordered construction of the fort in the 16th century at a time when Antibes was situated on a tense border with the Duchy of Savoy. During the 17th century, the Marquis de Vauban redeveloped it. The Fort was decommissioned in the early 20th century.

== History ==
=== Context ===
In the 16th century, Provence and the city of Antibes belonged to the Kingdom of France while the neighboring County of Nice depended on the Duchy of Savoy, with the border being formed by the Var river. The tensions between the Kingdom of France and the Duchy of Savoy stemmed from the alliance of the latter with the Habsburg Spain. During the Italian wars, the Spaniards sacked Antibes in 1524 and 1536, underscoring the weakness of the region's defenses.

The south-east of Provence was at the time, therefore, a tense border zone that the kings of France sought to fortify from the reign of François I onwards. With these tensions in mind, Henry II decided to build the fort at its strategic location: the building operated as a sentinel, (placed on a promontory 26 meters above sea level) providing a vantage point from which to monitor the border with the Duchy of Savoy.

The exact dates of construction are not known. However, the first official mention of the fort is found in 1552 in the archives of the city of Antibes, which ordered that compensation be paid to a man whose house was accidentally damaged by a cannonball fired from the fort.

=== Construction ===
No documentation has survived on the construction of the fort. However, according to local tradition, Jean de Renaud de Saint Rémy (commissioner of the artillerie) and Francois de Mandon (military engineer in Provence) were in charge. The chapel of Saint-Laurent, which was on the hill, was destroyed in order to make way for the military building (not an anodyne demolition at the time) and the name of the chapel was retained for the central tower of the Fort Carré, which still bears the name of "Tour Saint-Laurent".

Henry III had four bastions added in 1565, whereupon it became the Fort Carré (the square fort). The initial construction lasted about 25 years. In 1585, the fort's design was modified to accommodate 16 cannon.

Vauban visited Antibes in the 1680s and had little esteem for the military value of the fort that existed at that time. Nevertheless, he established a list of projects to be carried out for the defense of Antibes, its port, and the Fort Carré (where he recommended, for example, restoring old window openings, improving water collection and quality, and building sentry boxes on the bastions). However, few of these projects were actually carried out, although he did make several improvements. In particular he repaired the rooms, floor treatment and chimneys in order to improve the living conditions of the troops. He also created external defences: reinforcement of the angles of the bastions with granite; addition of traverses to protect against ricochet fire; and replacement of the tops of the stone parapets — which were liable to scatter deadly splinters when hit by shot — with brick ones. Vauban also enlarged the embrasures and added outer walls to the fortification. He entrusted the engineer, Antoine de Niquet, with the task of supervising this work.

The silhouette of the building was not modified by Vauban. Vauban visited the fort again in 1701 and made plans to turn Antibes into a major military port. However, the King did not authorize this plan as he considered it too costly. Thus although Vauban had some involvement in developing it, the current form of Fort Carré is, for the most part, the one it had in the 16th century.

In addition to improving the defences of Fort Carré, Vauban fortified Antibes itself, adding a land front of four arrow-headed bastions around the town, as well as seaward fortifications, including a bastion on the breakwater closing the harbor.

The entrance to the fort is through a triangular work that protrudes from the walls, and which is pierced by a heavy wooden door. From here, a narrow bridge leads into the fort itself via the flank of one of the bastions. Inside, there are barracks for officers and men. The ramparts walkways are 43 meters above sea level.

=== Military events ===
Though the use of Fort Carré as a defensive installation spans more than three centuries, it was only attacked twice:

- In 1591, during the wars of religion, Duke Charles-Emmanuel I of Savoy made a breakthrough in Provence and took the stronghold of Antibes without a fight. The French army launched by Henri IV to reconquer Provence laid siege to Antibes and its fort in 1592. The Duke of Épernon who led the siege retook the town and the fort. This is the only known military capture of Fort Carré;
- In 1746 - 1747, during the War of the Austrian Succession, the Fort Carré and Antibes were bombarded by Austro-Sardinian artillery and the English fleet, but the fort withstood the bombardment.

During the French Revolution, Napoleon Bonaparte was briefly imprisoned there. In July 1794, after the violent overthrow of Robespierre, General Bonaparte was detained as a Jacobin sympathizer and held in Fort Carré for ten days. His friend and political ally, Antoine Christophe Saliceti, secured his release.

In 1815, after Napoleon was definitively defeated at the Battle of Waterloo, the Fort Carré was occupied without a fight by Austro-Sardinian forces. The reason for this peaceful surrender of the Fort are not known. In any case, the Austro-Sardinians used their position in the Fort to bomb Antibes in order to get the Antibois to open the city gates. Antibes refused, despite significant damage to the city, and remained loyal to Louis XVIII. This experience shows that the Fort and the city of Antibes have to be defended as a unit — otherwise, the Fort could be used to attack the city.

== Decommissioning and monument protection ==
The 19th century marked a turning point with the annexation of Nice to France in 1860 and as advances in military technology rendered the Fort Carré obsolete. The stronghold of Antibes and Fort Carré were decommissioned at the beginning of the 20th century, and part of the city ramparts were demolished. Soldiers were stationed there briefly during the First World War. Its last use in a military context dates to the Second World War: Fort Carré served, during the occupation, as a gathering center for foreigners for all the Alpes-Maritimes.

The fort was listed as a historical monument in 1906.

== In popular culture ==
Fort Carré appears as the villain's fortress in the James Bond film, Never Say Never Again (1983).

== Gallery ==
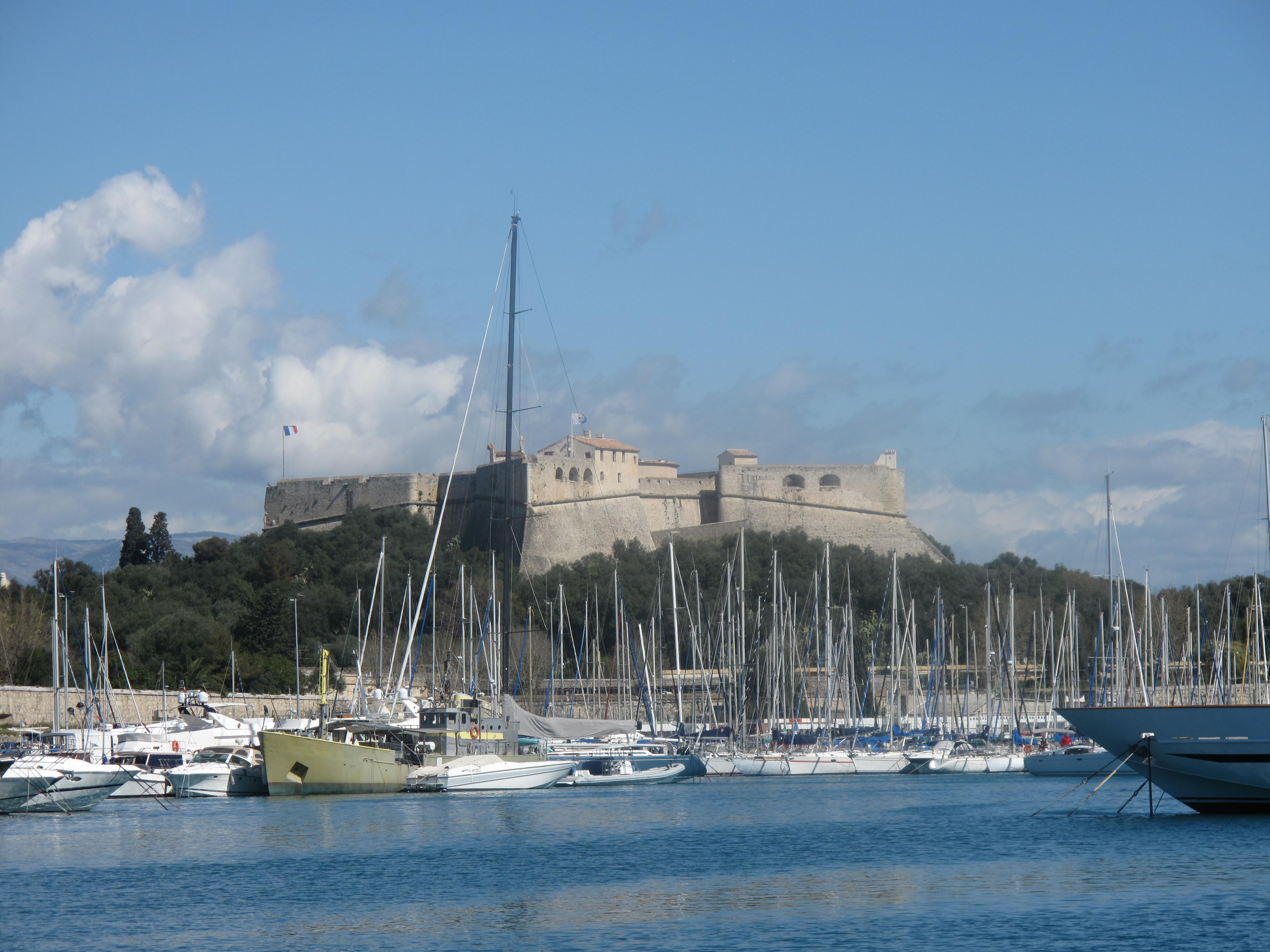
Harbor view

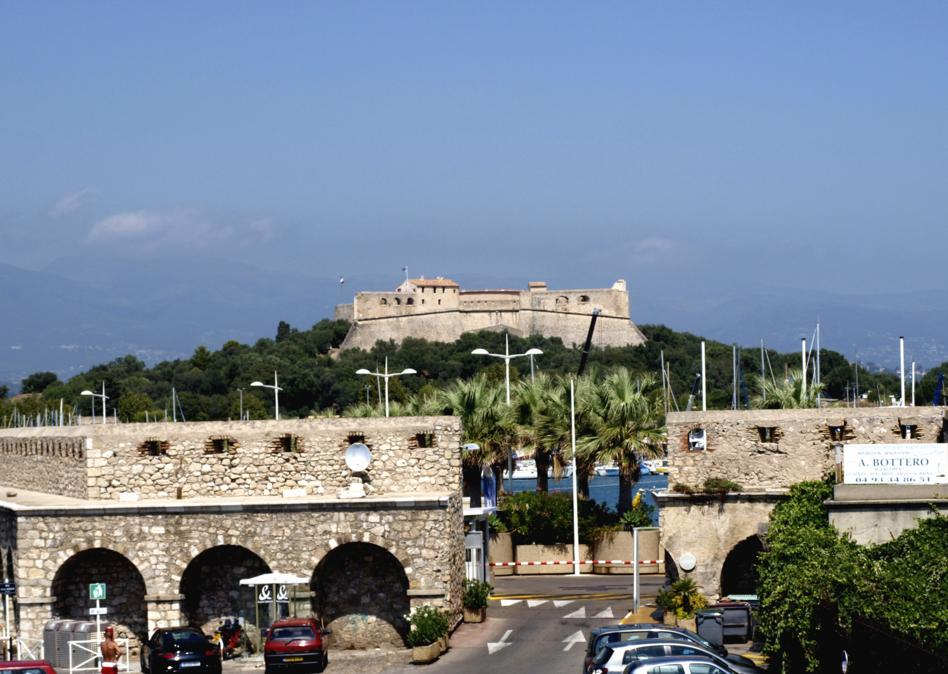
Metropolitan view

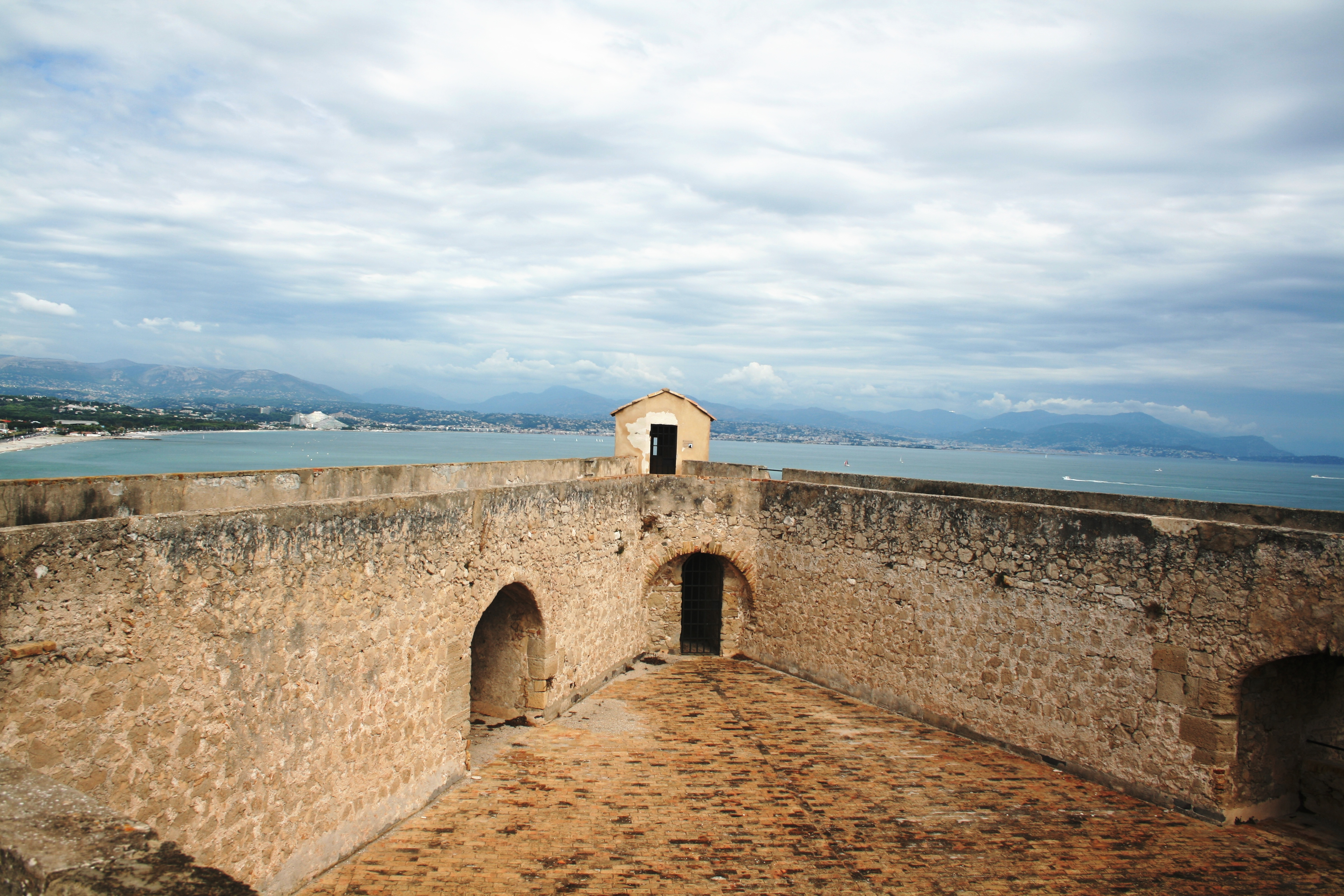
Courtyard, east side

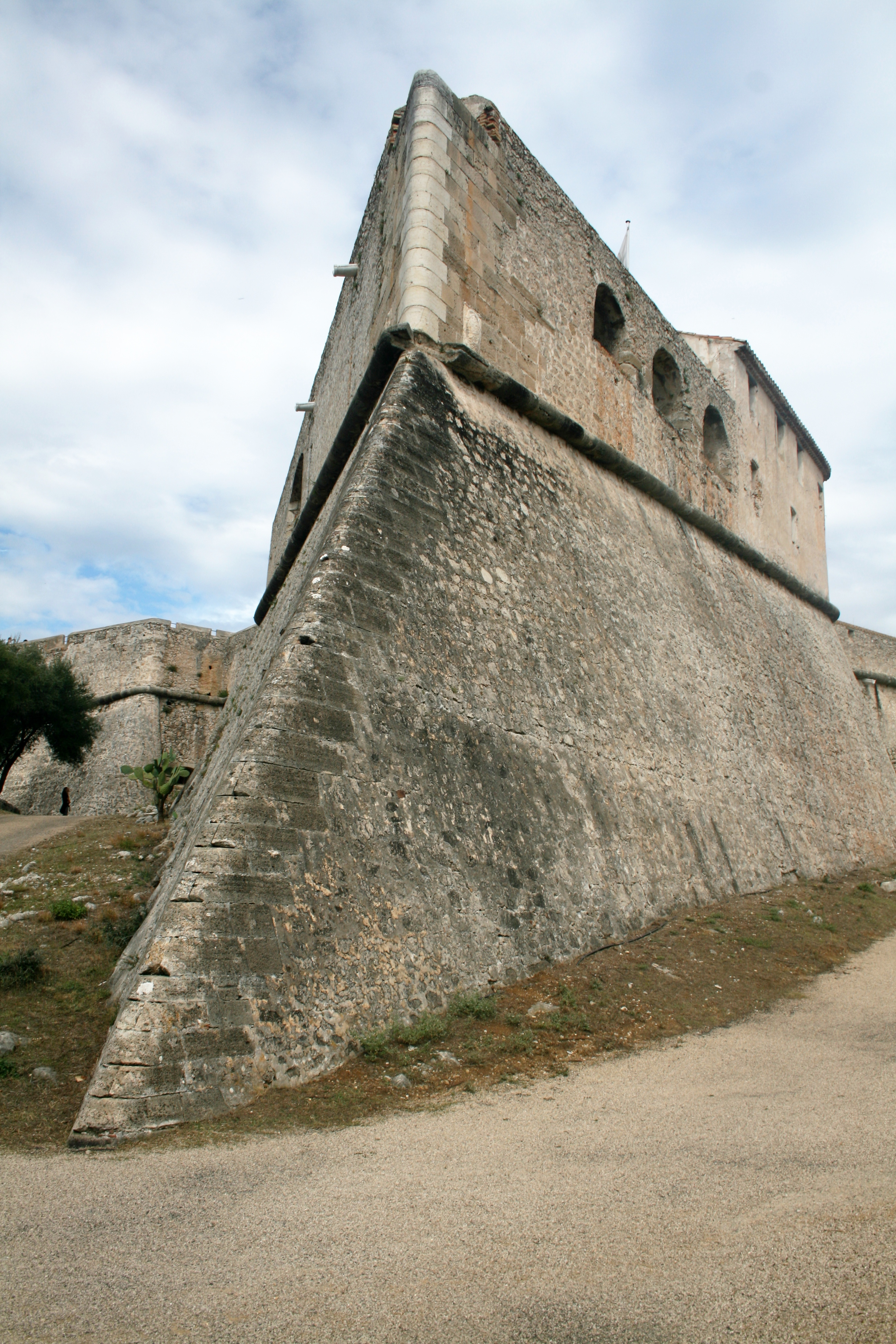
Southern bastion
