= Notre Dame de la Garoupe =

Coordinates: 43°33′51″N 7°07′56″E

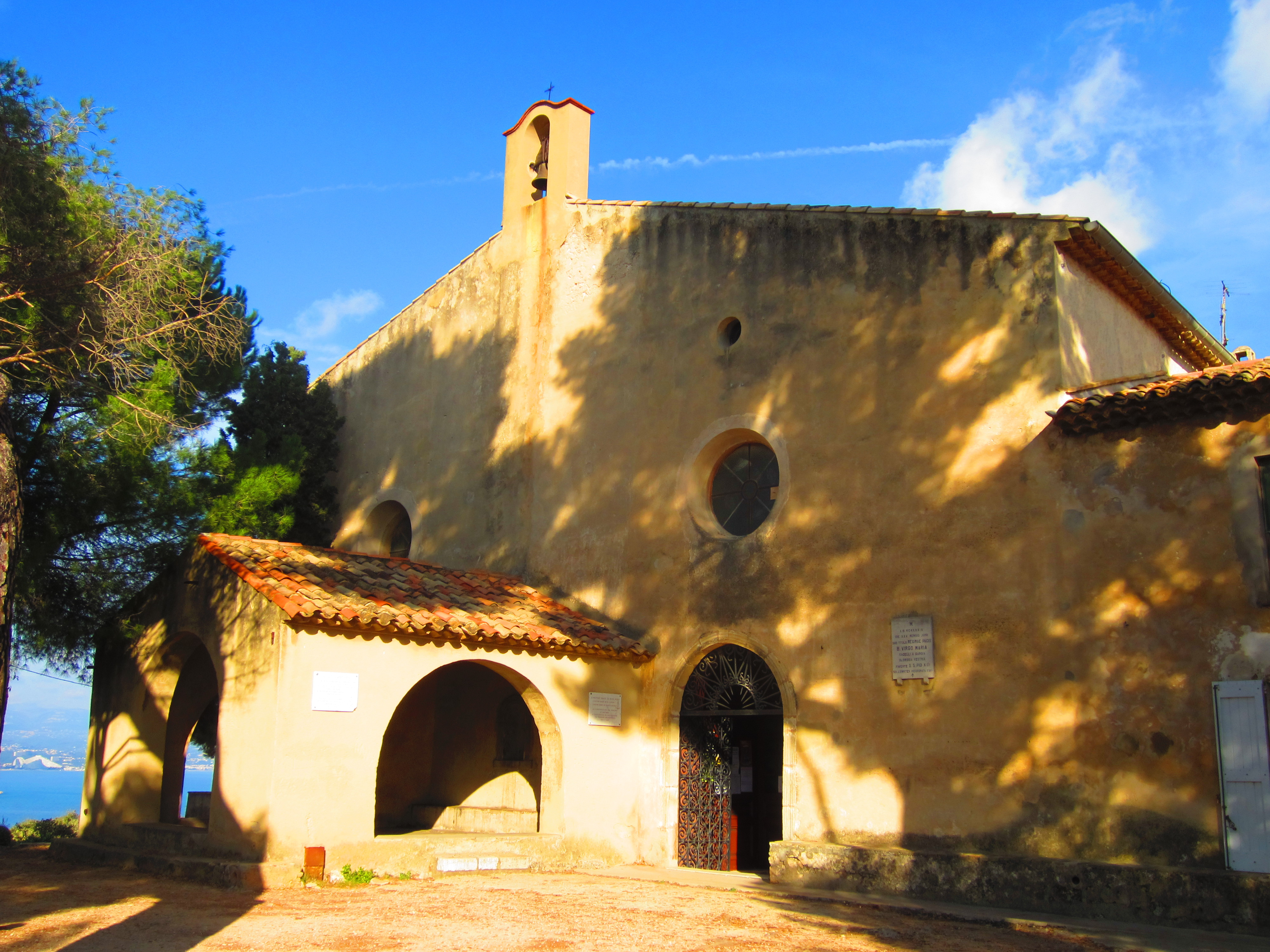
The church of Notre Dame de la Garoupe

Notre Dame de la Garoupe is a Catholic church in the French departement of Alpes-Maritimes. It is located on the Garoupe plateau overlooking the Cap d'Antibes. It is unusual in that it has two naves with one Madonna in each nave, Notre Dame de la Garde is in the right nave and Notre Dame de Bon Port is in the left nave. Notre Dame de Bon Port is the patron saint of the sailors of Antibes, who hold a procession with her statue every year in the month of July. The church building is listed as an historic monument by the French Ministry of Culture.

== History ==
A former Ligurian oppidum, the site has long been a place of veneration. The Romans celebrated the moon goddess Selene there. In the 5th century, the place was given an oratory dedicated to Saint Helen following her stopover in Antibes (then Antipolis) on her way back from a tour of the Holy Land.

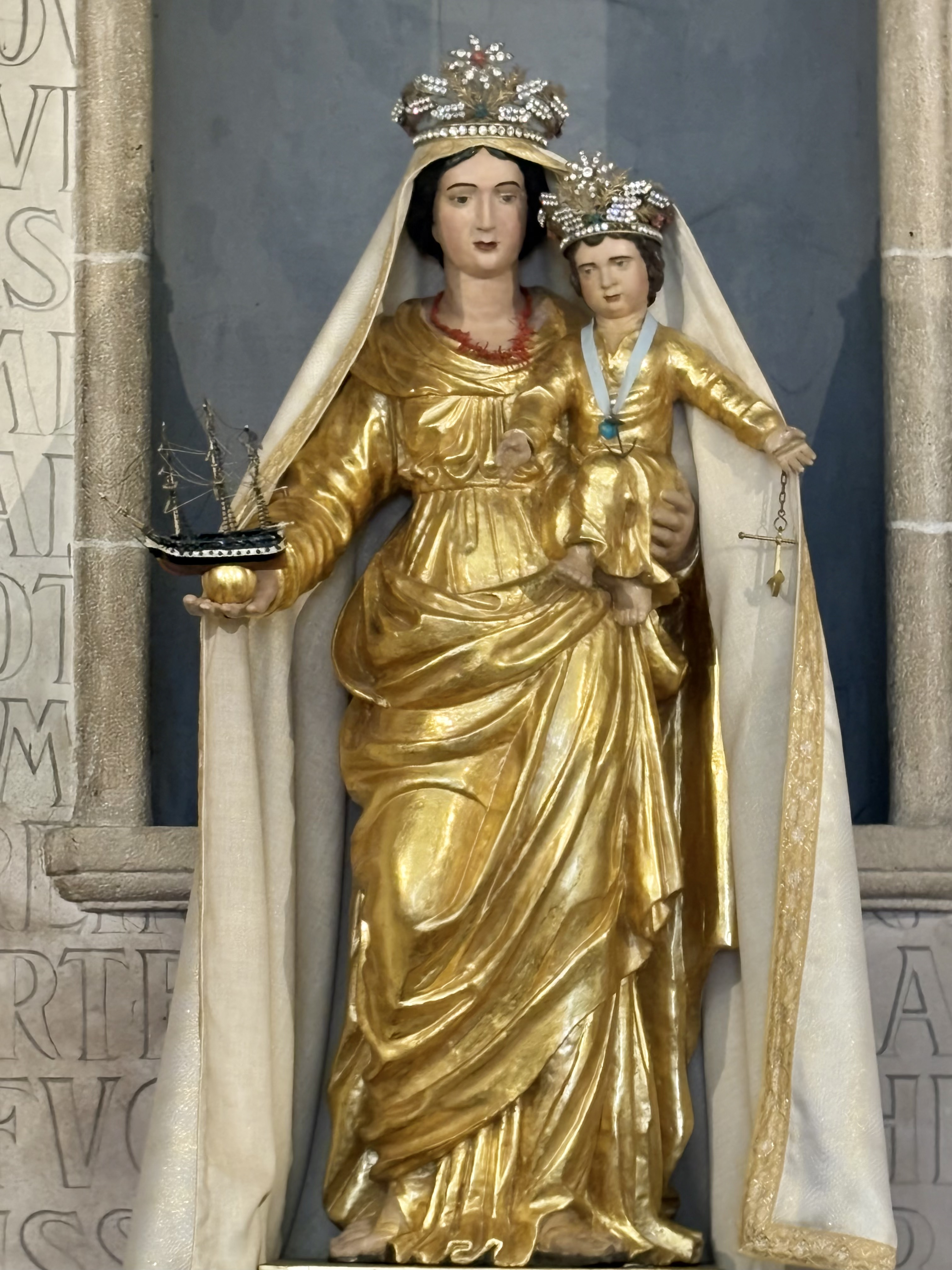
Notre Dame de Bon Port in the left nave of the church. She carries a three-masted ship in her right hand.

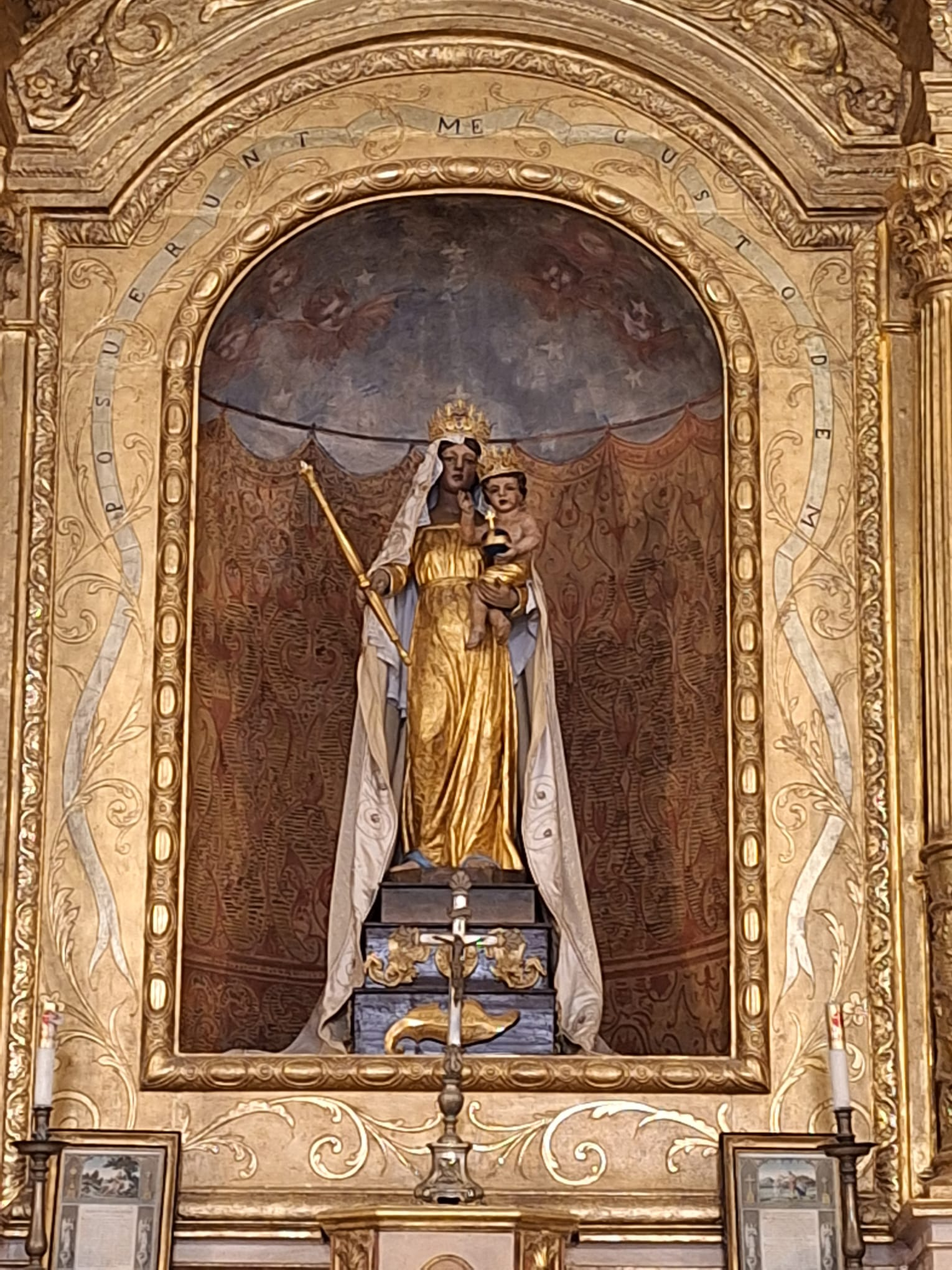
Notre Dame de la Garde, whose statue is located in the right nave of the church. She is surrounded by an ornate, gold retable.

The site has attracted Christian pilgrimages for centuries. The first pilgrimages date back to around the year 1000, and their millennium was celebrated in 1981. The construction of a first chapel dates back to the Middle Ages. Around 1520, the Cordeliers received a donation from René de Savoie and built a convent there whose sanctuary was dedicated to Notre-Dame de la Garde.

The church is unusual in that it displays two madonnas in its two naves: the right nave is dedicated to Notre-Dame de la Garde, whose statue is seen in the middle of an ornate, gold retable; the left nave is dedicated to Notre Dame de Bon Port, the patron saint of Antibes and of Antibes sailors. Her statue holds a three-masted ship in its right hand and is carved from the trunk of a fig tree.

Two frescoes decorate the two sanctuaries housing the altars. The fresco in the right-hand side of the church was executed in 1953 by Jacques-Henri Clergues and commemorates the visit of Pope Gregory XI to Antibes in 1376 and the gift of René de Savoie. The fresco in the left-hand sanctuary offers visitors a spiritual image of sailors and other citizens of Antibes and was executed in 1948 by the painter Édouard Collin.

The right sanctuary is adorned with a retable executed in 1710 by the Antibes sculptor Joseph Dolle and restored in 2017.

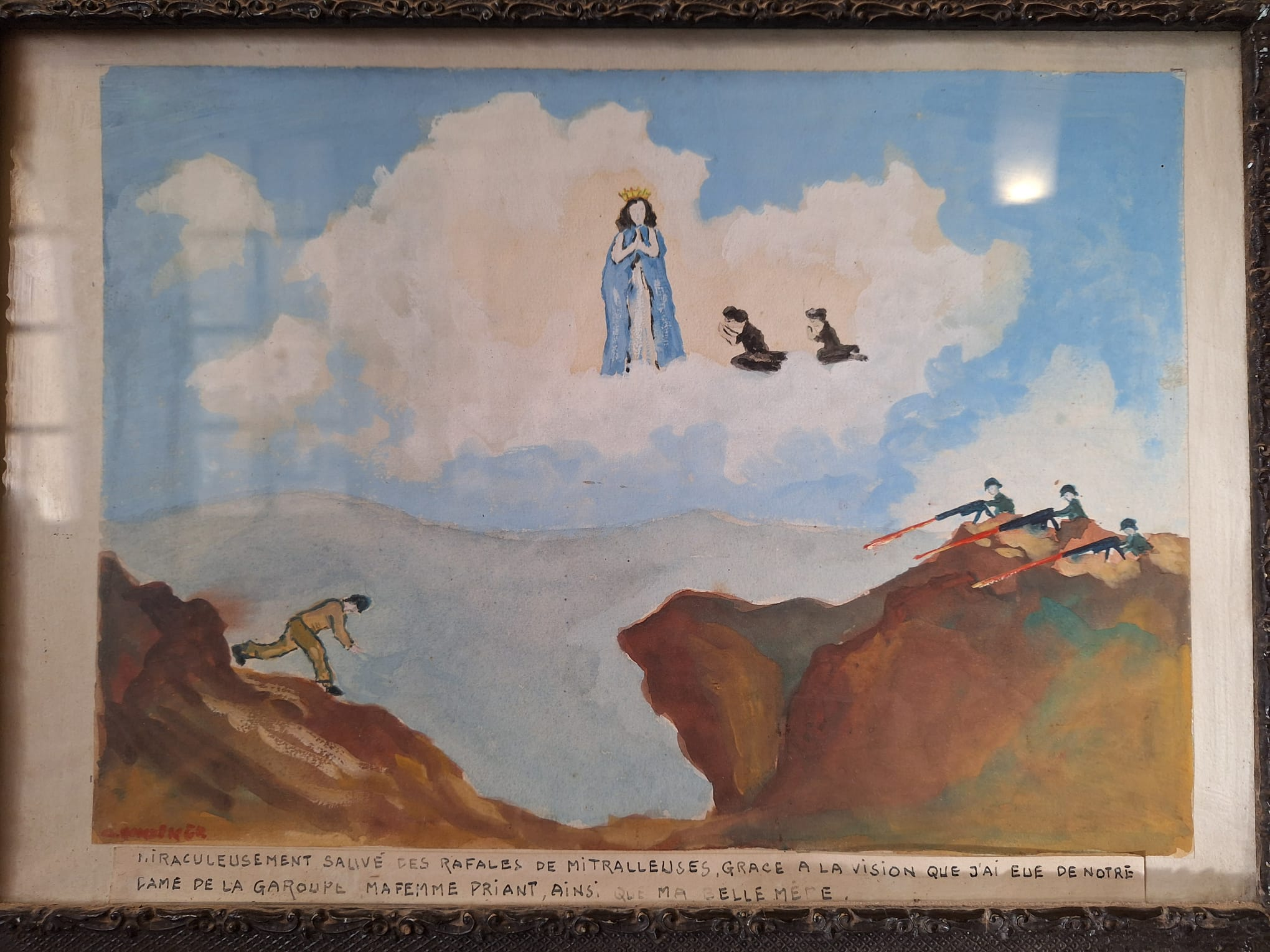
Ex voto thanking Notre Dame de la Garoupe, as well as the prayers of a wife and a mother-in-law, for saving a man from intense machine gun fire.

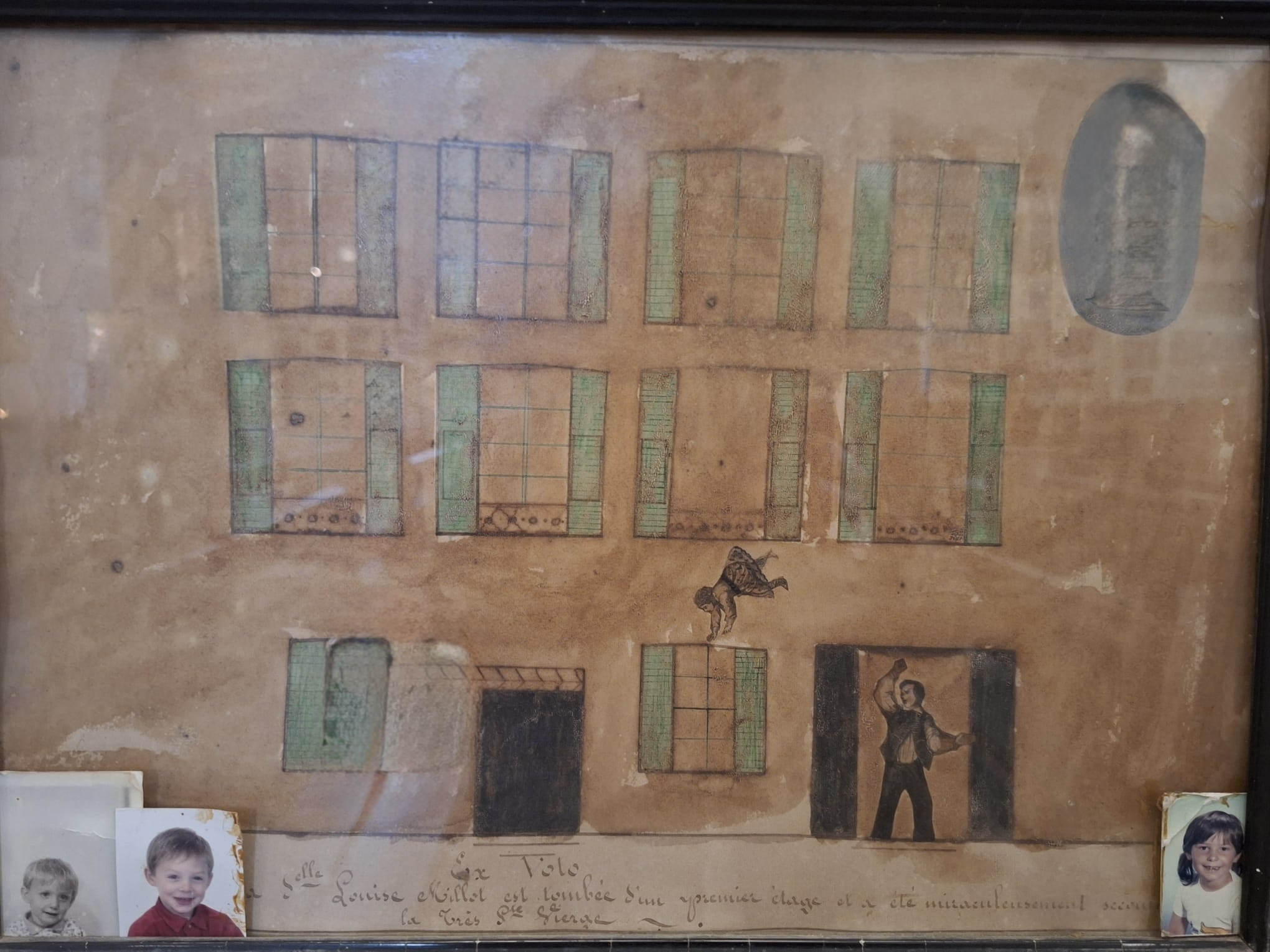
Ex voto giving thanks to the Virgin Mary for saving a child who fell from the second floor of a building (first floor by French counting).

Around 300 ex-votos are placed on the walls and in the church, the oldest of which dates from 1506. The ex-votos thank Notre Dame de Bon Port for her help in surviving various disasters such as shipwrecks, sickness and accidents as well as, in one case, helping a convict to escape the penal colony in Toulon and start a new life in the West Indies. Others thank Notre Dame de la Garde for assistance during war, accidents, serious illness or other catastrophic events.

Also of note are a painting of the Assumption from the Bréa school of painting, a Byzantine icon from 1575 and objects collected during the siege of Sebastopol, during the Crimean War.

The church used to be associated with a watchtower (for pirates or other invaders), but the tower was later destroyed by an earthquake.

Unlike many churches in France, Notre Dame de la Garoupe was spared the vandalism of revolutionaries during the French Revolution. Thus, the church and its contents survived the Revolution intact. The building was registered as a historic monument on October 29, 1926.

== Notre Dame de Bon Port and the sailors of Antibes ==
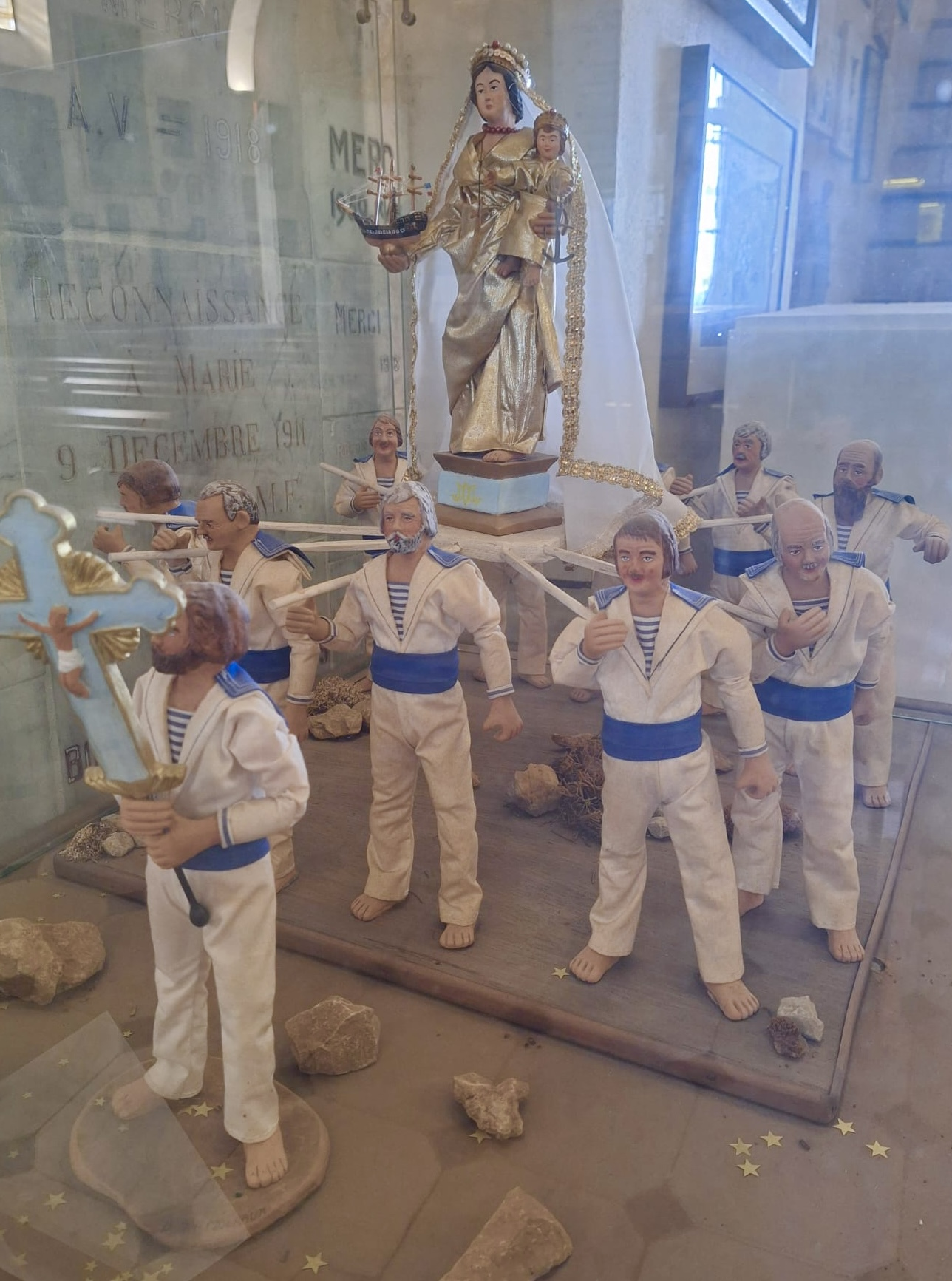
Scene depicting sailors in procession with the statue of Notre Dame de Bon Port

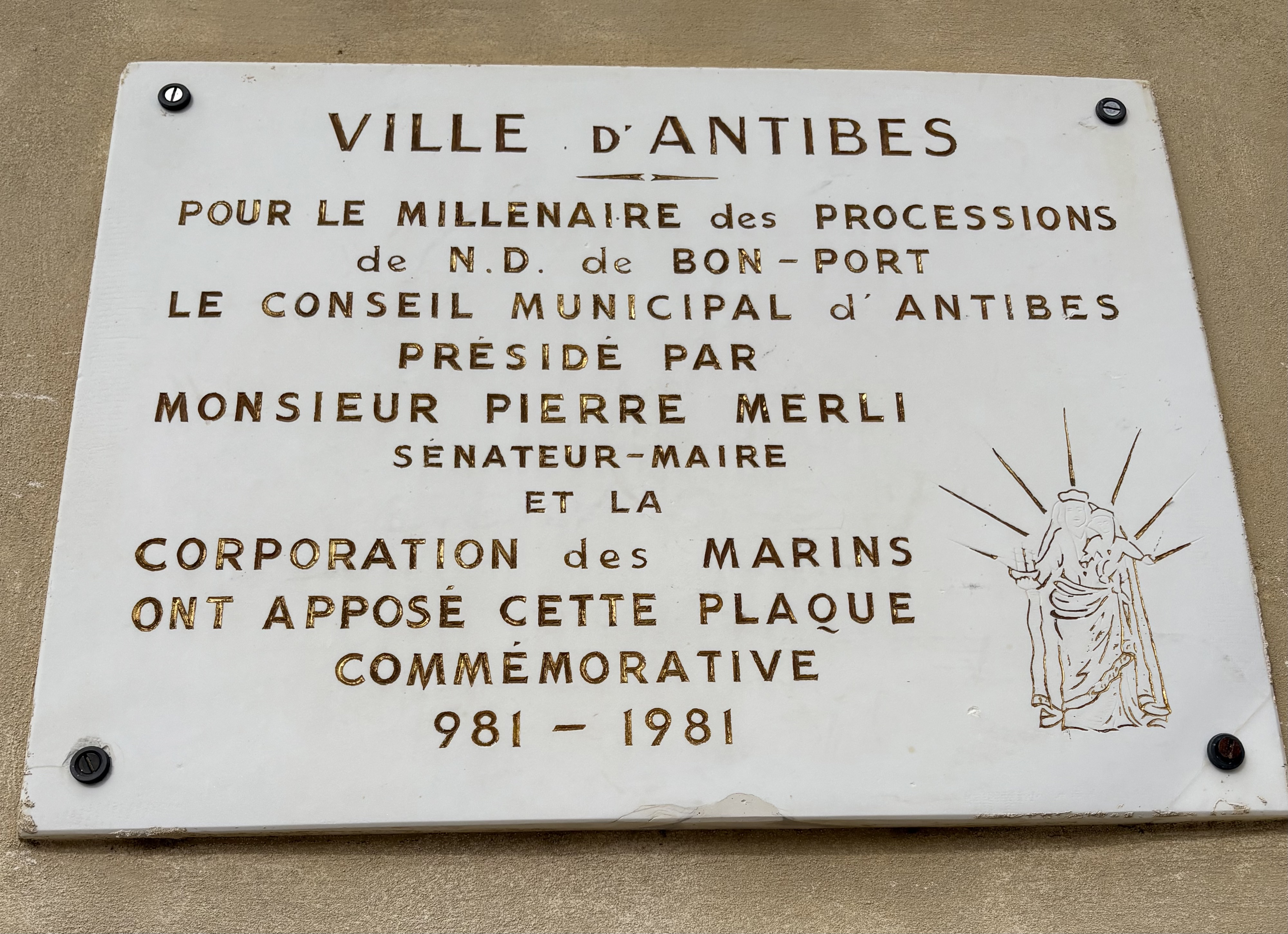
Plaque on the church commemorating one thousand years of processions venerating Notre Dame de Bon Port

Notre-Dame de Bon-Port is the protector of Antibes Juan-les-Pins and the patron saint of the sailors of Antibes. She is credited with driving out the bubonic plague from Antibes.

The Corporation des Marins d'Antibes holds an annual festival that recalls and solicits the protections that have been offered to sailors by Notre Dame de Bon Port since the 16th century. In accordance with the custom for this festival, her statue is carried down by sailors to the Antibes Cathedral on the first Thursday of July by the way of the stations of the cross that line a roughly paved path. The sailors are barefoot and wear their traditional blue and white garb. The statue is then brought back up to la Garoupe on the following Sunday.

Ex votos dedicated to Notre Dame de Bon Port

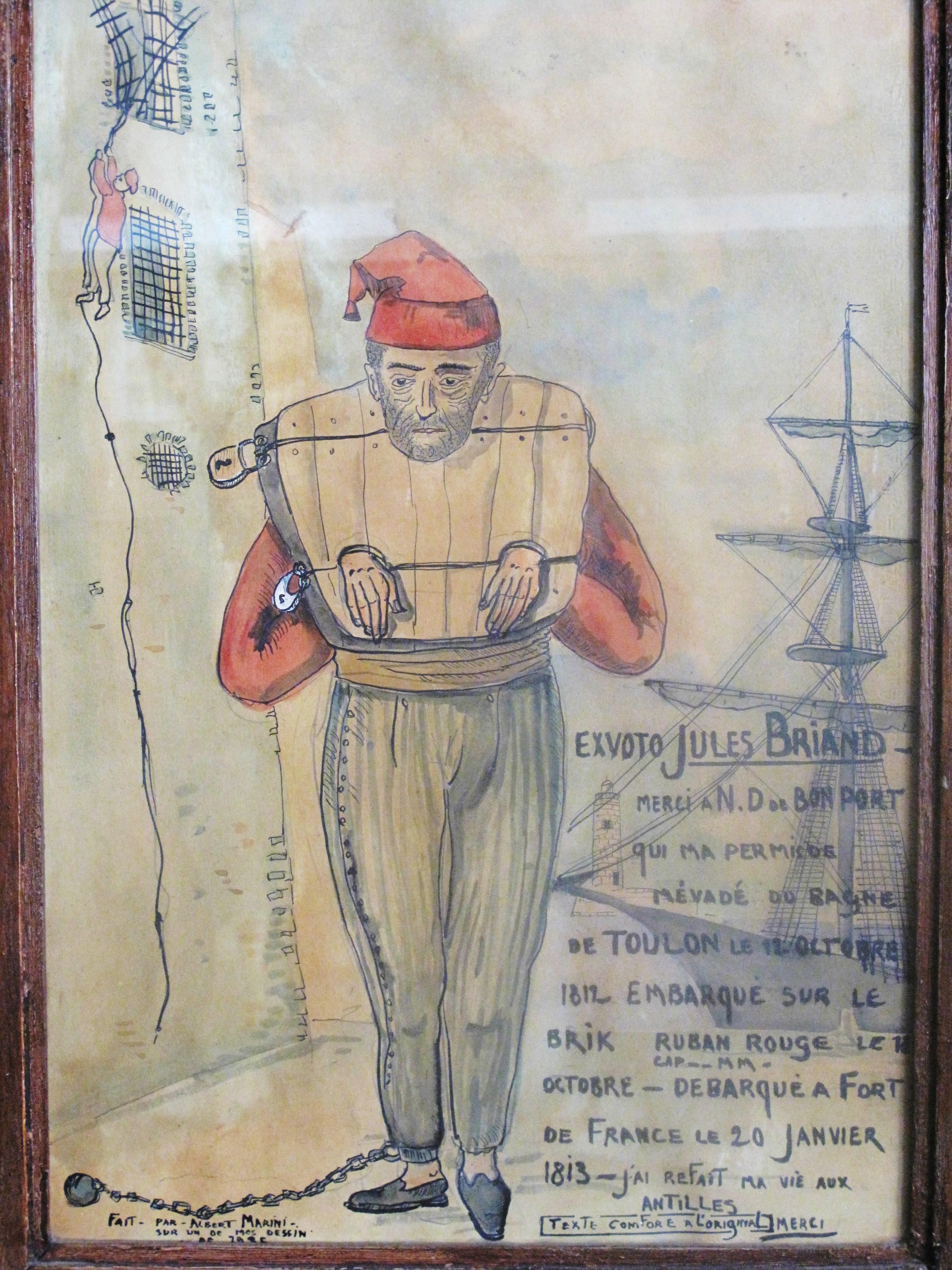
Ex voto offered by Jules Briand, who escaped from the penal colony at Toulon in 1812 and started a new life in the Antilles

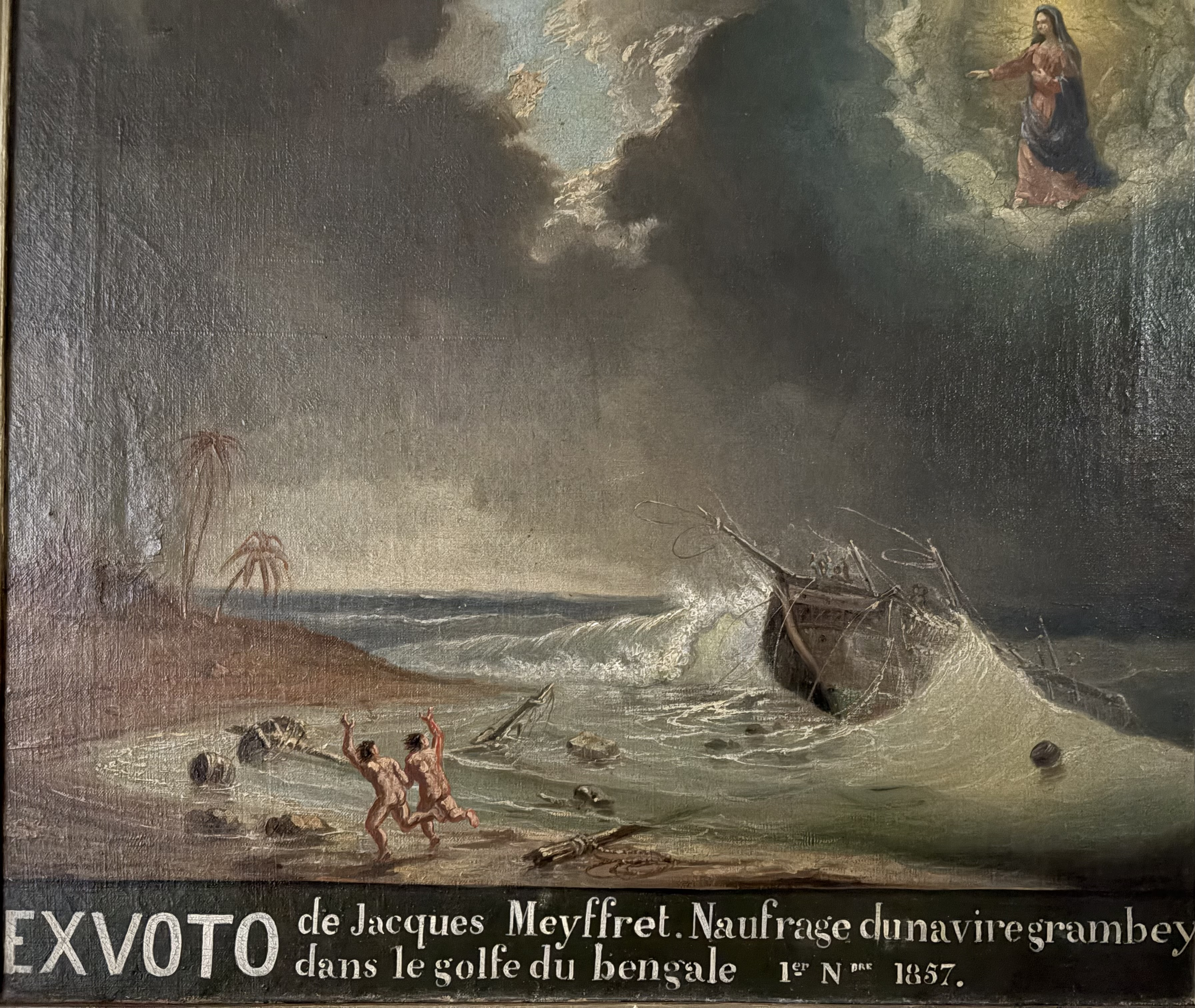
Ex-voto thanking Notre Dame de Bon Port for her intervention during a shipwreck in the Bay of Bengal in 1857

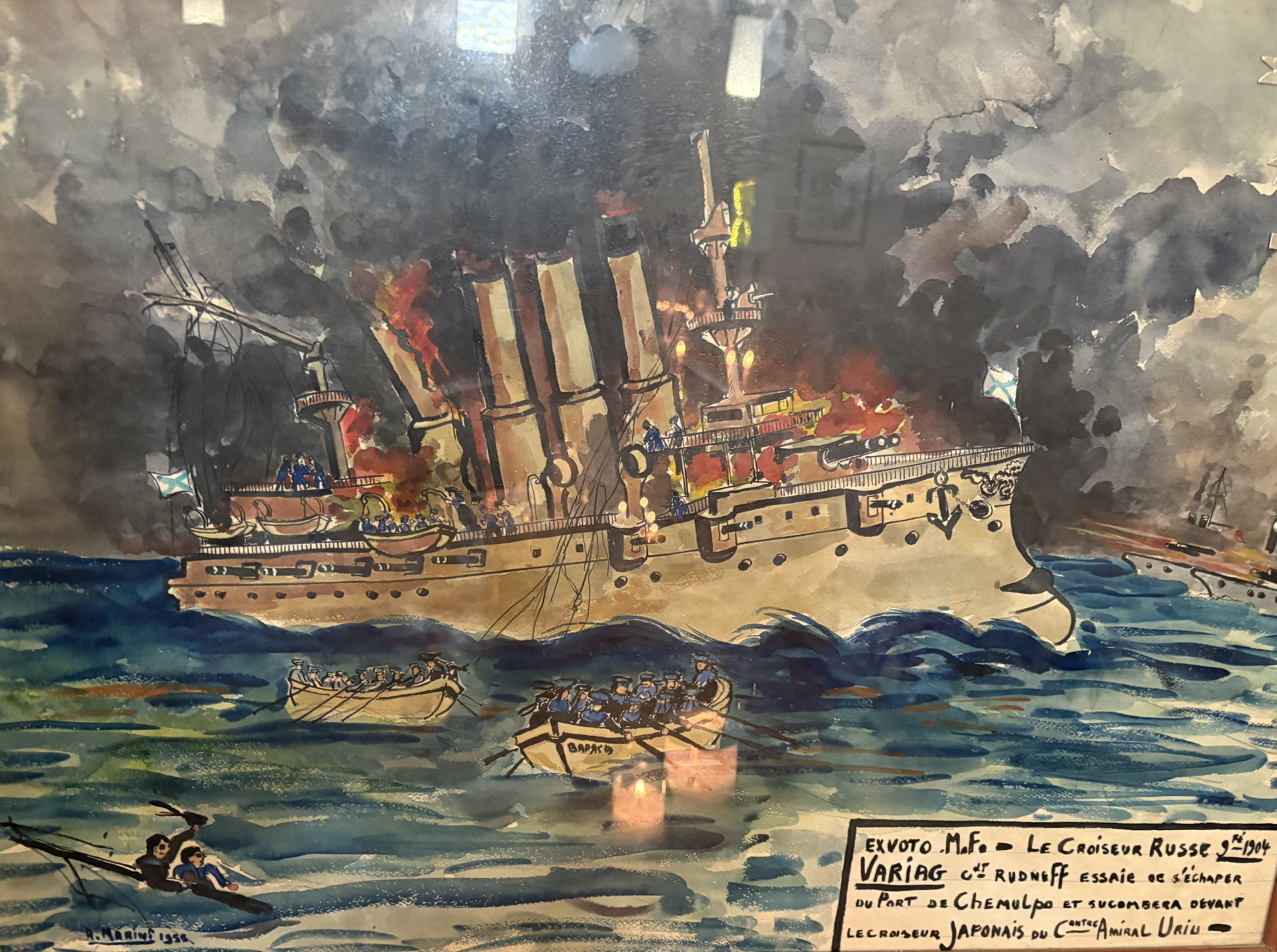
Sinking of the battleship Varyag in Chemulpo Bay during the Russo-Japanese War in 1904. A survivor gives thanks to Notre Dame de Bon Port.
