= Antibes Cathedral =

Cathedral in Antibes, France

Coordinates: 43°34′52″N 7°7′42″E

Antibes Cathedral Cathédrale Notre-Dame-de-l'Immaculée-Conception d'Antibes
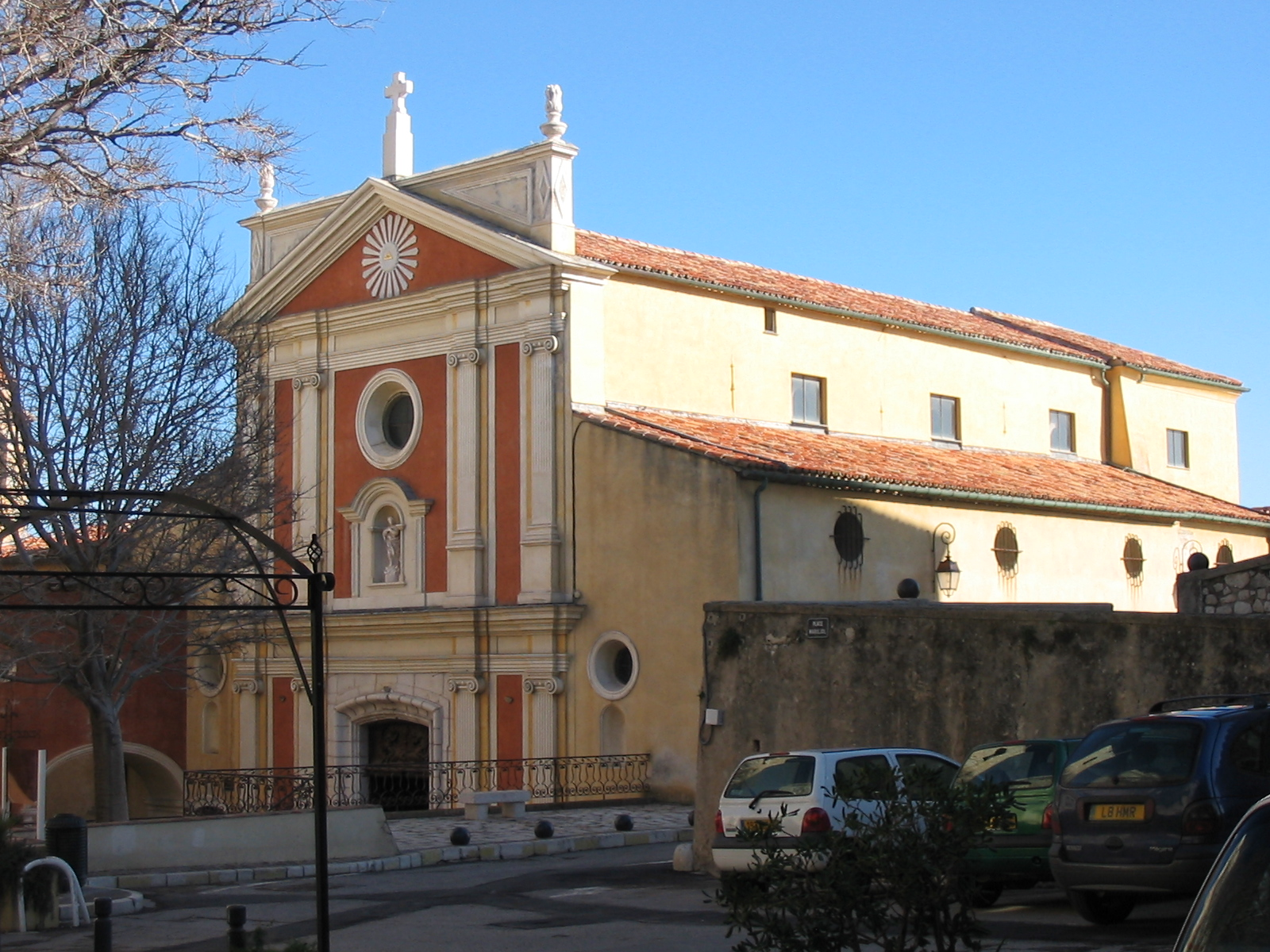
- Antibes Cathedral

Religion
- Affiliation: Roman Catholic
- Province: Diocese of Nice
- Region: Alpes-Maritimes
- Ecclesiastical or organisational status: Cathedral
- Status: Active

Location
- Location: Antibes, France
- Interactive map of Antibes Cathedral; Cathédrale Notre-Dame-de-l'Immaculée-Conception d'Antibes

Architecture
- Type: church
- Groundbreaking: 5th century
- Completed: 18th century

Antibes Cathedral (French: Cathédrale Notre-Dame-de-l'Immaculée-Conception d'Antibes or Cathédrale Notre-Dame-de-la-Platea d'Antibes) is a Roman Catholic church located in the town of Antibes on the French Riviera, France. It is a listed and protected historic monument.

== History ==
Local tradition maintains that a pagan temple dedicated to the Roman goddesses Diana and Minerva once stood on the site, and that St Paul stopped here to preach in AD 63, during a journey to Spain.

The Bishopric of Antibes was established c.450 by Pope Leo I, the first two bishops being Armentarius and Agroecius. Presumably it was around this time that the cathedral was first built, and indeed the altar in the Chapel of the Holy Sacrament has been dated to the Merovingian era.

The cathedral was destroyed during a raid on Antibes by Saracen pirates in 1124, and rebuilt on the initiative of Berenguer Ramon, Count of Provence; the choir, the oldest surviving part of the cathedral structure, dates to this phase of construction. Further raids followed over the next century or so, and in 1244 the bishops relocated to Grasse to escape their depredations. The bishops remained there for the next five centuries, despite an attempt to lure them back to Antibes by rebuilding the cathedral in 1250.

The cathedral was destroyed yet again in the eighteenth century, this time by Austrian bombardment during the 1746-7 Siege of Antibes. Louis XV personally issued an edict for the cathedral's reconstruction in June 1747, and the external form of the building dates largely to this phase of its history.

The Bishopric of Grasse was suppressed during the French Revolution and was not restored by the Concordat of 1801; instead its territory, including Antibes, was assigned to the Diocese of Nice.

The Cathedral, along with the adjoining Chapel of the Holy Spirit and the nearby Tour Grimaldi, was added to the French Ministry of Culture’s List of Historic Monuments in 1945.

== Architecture and Art ==
The church layout features three naves and a large organ to the rear. The current facade is in the Italian style, dating from 1747 when it was rebuilt after the Austrian bombardment.

In the interior are a number of splendid works of art, the most renowned of which is the altarpiece of Our Lady of the Rosary in the transept chapel, which was produced in 1515 by the Niçois painter Louis Brea. Also of note are the cathedral's carved walnut doors, which depict Saint Roch and Saint Sebastian, the two patron saints of Antibes, and were made c.1710 by the Antibois sculptor Jacques Dolle.

== See also ==
- Tour Grimaldi
- Notre Dame de la Garoupe
