= Tour Grimaldi =

Medieval tower in southern France

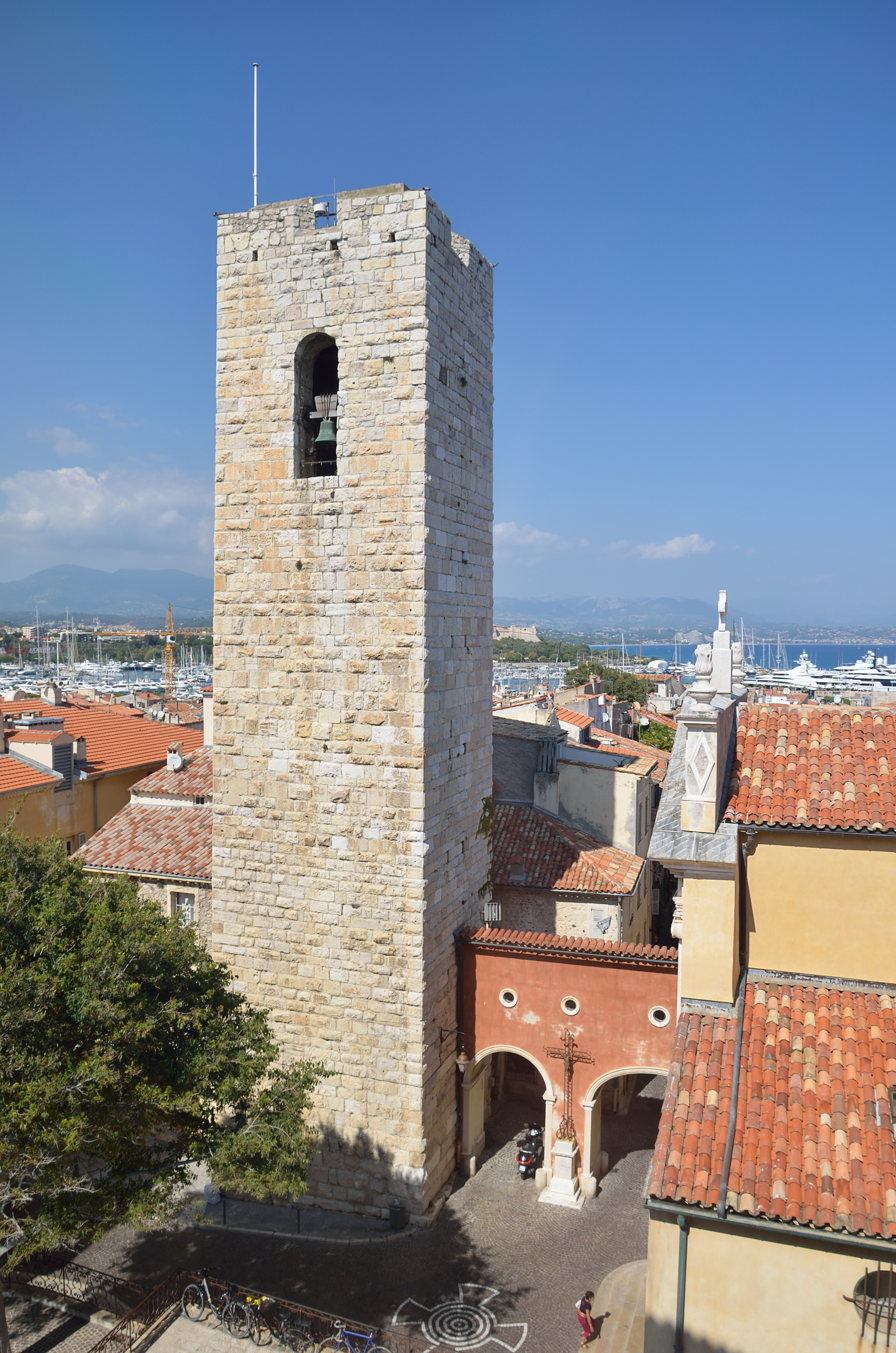
The Grimaldi Tower in Antibes

The Grimaldi tower is one of two towers that stand next to the Saint-Esprit chapel and the old cathedral in Antibes, in the Alpes-Maritimesdepartment, in France. Built in the 11th century as a defensive tower to give early warnings of Saracen attacks, the tower now serves as a bell tower for the Antibes Cathedral.

== History ==
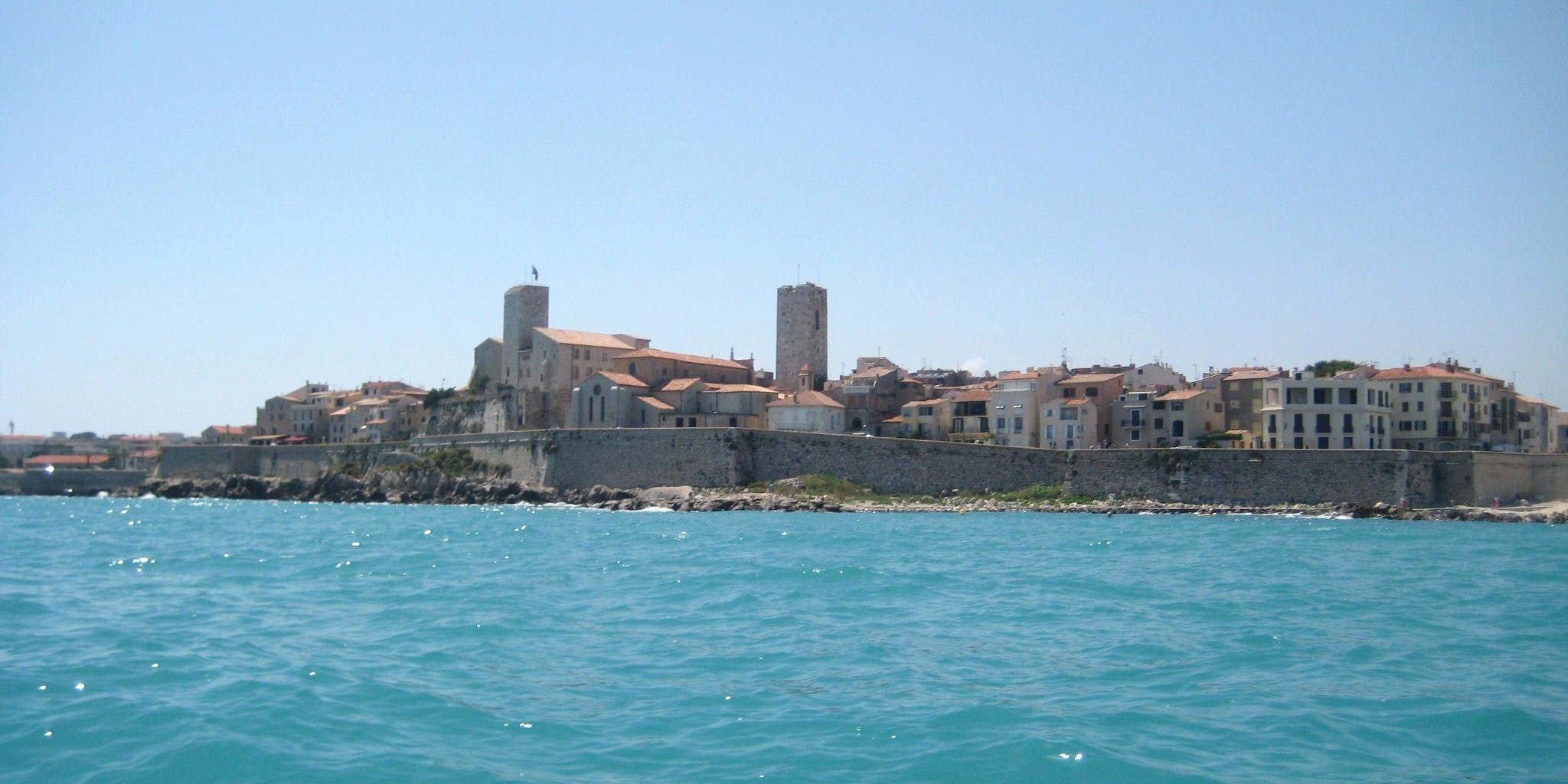
The old town of Antibes, with its two ‘Saracen towers’. The Grimaldi tower is the one on the right.

Since the building archives have been destroyed, the exact date of the construction of the tower cannot be established with certainty. It is known, however, that it was built shortly after the recapture of the region from the Saracens, so its construction may date from the 11th century.

This construction was therefore contemporaneous with the possession of the seigneury of Antibes by the Rodoald family. In the 10th century, Antibes was under constant threat of attack by the Saracens, who maintained a permanent fortified settlement near Fraxinetum, near Saint-Tropez. In about 974 (sources vary regarding the exact date), the Saracens were defeated and driven from Provence by William I of Provence, who subsequently rewarded the knights who fought by his side with gifts of conquered land. In about 975, William gave what was, at the time, a modest fortified settlement to Rodoard, head of a branch of the powerful family of the house of Grasse. Rodoald thereby became the Count of Antibes and fief of William, Count of Provence. Although, after the defeat, the Saracens maintained no permanent settlement in Provence, they continued to launch sporadic raids. Rodoald and his family are thought to have been responsible for the construction of the tower for defensive purposes.

The seigniory of Antibes was given to the bishop of Grasse in 1275. The Bishop of Grasse retained temporal jurisdiction until the time of Clement VII who, in 1383, transferred it to the Grimaldi family for 9,000 florins. Although the Grimaldi family was already powerful elsewhere in the Mediterranean region, it only arrived in Antibes much later— about 1378. Thus, although the tower carries the Grimaldi name, it was not built by them.

== Description ==
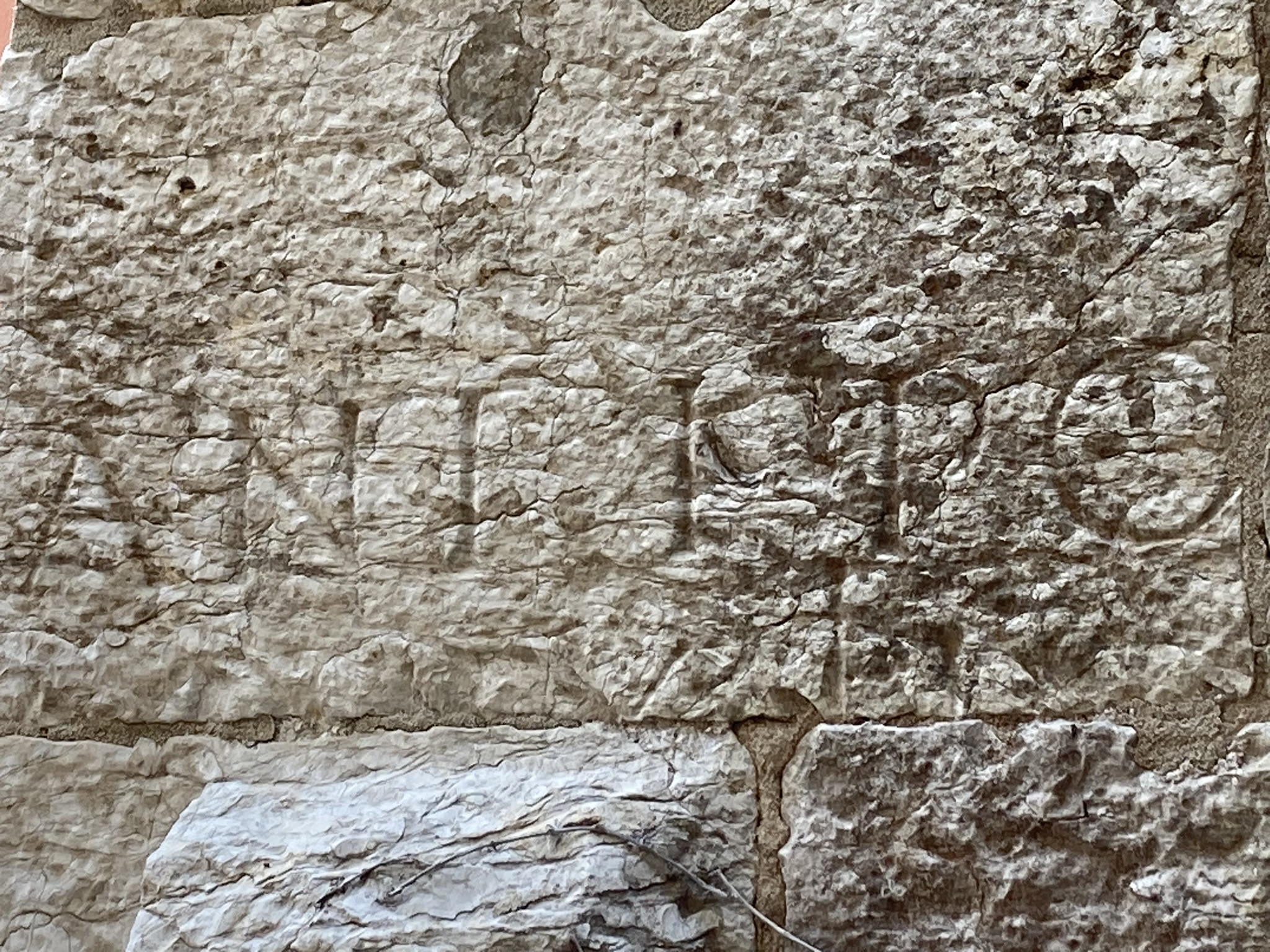
Roman inscription on the northern facade of the Tour Grimaldi. The inscription reads: A N T I P O.

The Grimaldi tower is 30 meters high with a square section of 7.50 m per side. The thickness of the walls at the base is 2 meters. The exterior facing has 70 dressed stone courses whose thicknesses vary between 0.55 m and 0.30 m. Many of these stones were salvaged from Roman buildings and some have Roman inscriptions and appear to be elements of architraves or cornices.

The interior is divided into four stories, the upper three of which are approximately equal in height, and half as high as the ground floor. The ground floor communicates with the first floor only by a square hole and one could descend there only by a ladder.

The original access door to the tower, located on the north face, has been walled over. Its threshold was 0.60 m above the floor of the first floor, or 6 m above the ground. Thus, the tower could only be accessed by a sliding ladder. The current accesses are modern: there is one on the west facade at 1.40 m above the ground, and one on the east facade.

The second and third floors received daylight only through barbicans 0.80 m wide, on each side, placed 1 m above the floor. The openings on the third floor, which hold the bells, are modern.

The upper platform is supported by a vault. It is reached by a stone staircase.

The Grimaldi tower now serves as the bell tower of the Antibes Cathedral (French: Cathédrale Notre-Dame-de-l'Immaculée-Conception d'Antibes), which is located directly across the street.

== Listing as Historic Monument ==
The Ministry of Culture listed the Grimaldi tower, together with the Cathedral and the adjoining chapel of the Holy Spirit, as a heritage monument by order of 16 October 1945.

== See also ==
- History of Provence
- Muslim presence in Medieval France
